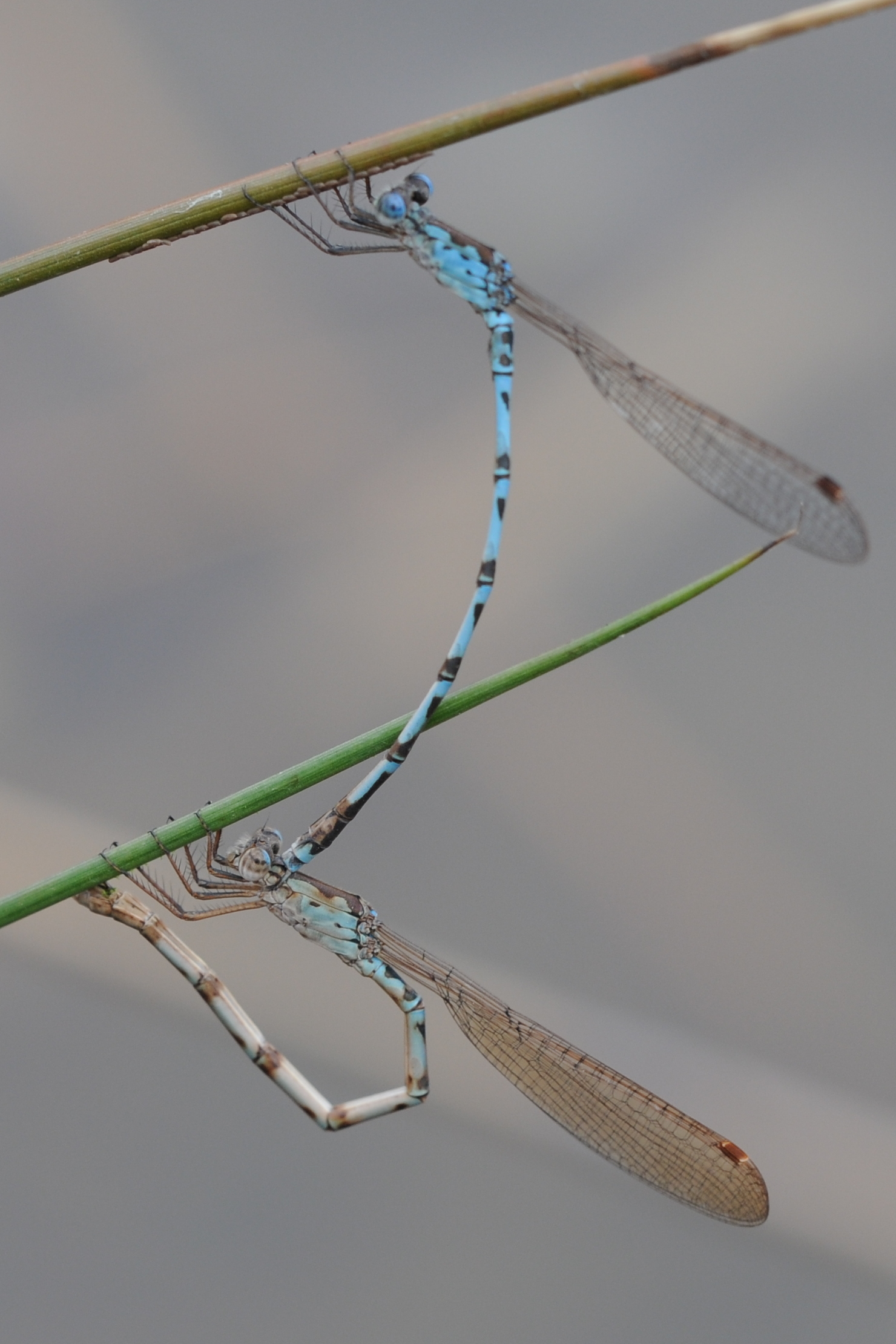
- Indolestes peregrinus

Scientific classification
- Kingdom: Animalia
- Phylum: Arthropoda
- Clade: Pancrustacea
- Class: Insecta
- Order: Odonata
- Suborder: Zygoptera
- Superfamily: Lestoidea; Calvert, 1901

Families
- Hemiphlebiidae; Lestidae; Perilestidae; Synlestidae
- Distribution of superfamily Lestoidea

Synonyms
- Lestinoidea Fraser, 1957

= Lestoidea (superfamily) =

Superfamily of damselflies

Lestoidea is a superfamily of damselflies comprising the families Hemiphlebiidae, Lestidae, Perilestidae and Synlestidae. Members occur on every continent except Antarctica, with greatest diversity in tropical and temperate regions.

Studies of damselfly evolution indicate Lestoidea as an ancient lineage that is the sister group to all other living damselflies, making it the earliest-diverging extant damselfly lineage.

== Taxonomic history ==
In 1862, Selys grouped damselflies of this kind in his “Legion Lestes”. In 1901, Calvert used the subfamily name Lestinae for the Lestes group; the superfamily name Lestoidea is attributed to him from that year.

Fraser used Lestini for a superfamily comprising Perilestidae, Chlorolestidae and Lestidae in 1951, and later used the name Lestinoidea. Bridges treated Lestinoidea as a synonym of Lestoidea in 1994.

Some earlier classifications included the family Lestoideidae in Lestoidea. In 2026, Carter and colleagues placed that family in the newly recognised superfamily Euphaeoidea, leaving four living families in Lestoidea.

== Phylogeny ==
- Zygoptera
  - Lestoidea
  - - Platystictoidea
    - - Priscagrionoidea
      - - - Tatocnemidoidea
          - Polythoroidea
        - - - Mesopodagrionoidea
            - - Amphipterygoidea
              - Euphaeoidea
          - - - Philogangoidea
              - - Megapodagrionoidea
                - Calopterygoidea
            - Coenagrionoidea

Relationships among living damselfly superfamilies, based on Carter et al. (2026).

== Families ==
The following families are currently placed in Lestoidea:

- Hemiphlebiidae Kennedy, 1920
- Lestidae Calvert, 1901
- Perilestidae Kennedy, 1920
- Synlestidae Tillyard, 1917

== Fossil record ==
Fossils attributed to Lestoidea are known from the Cretaceous onward, with records from Europe, Asia and the Americas.

Lestoidea includes the extinct family †Eolestidae, known from Eocene deposits in North America.

=== Fossil genera ===
The following fossil genera are currently assigned to Lestoidea:

- †Albertalestes Jouault & Nel, 2023
- †Cerdanyagrion Nel et al., 1996
- †Cretalestes Jarzembowski et al., 1998
- †Cretaphylolestes Huang et al., 2021
- †Danolestes Simonsen et al., 2025
- †Eolestes Cockerell, 1940
- †Gaurimacia Vasilenko, 2005
- †Inacayalestes Petrulevičius, 2015
- †Lutetialestes Greenwalt & Bechly, 2014
- †Madres Petrulevičius, 2018
- †Palaeoperilestes Zheng et al., 2016
- †Palaeophylolestes Doriath-Döhler et al., 2023

== Etymology ==
The superfamily name Lestoidea is derived from the type genus Lestes and the zoological suffix -oidea, used for superfamilies.

Some authors have used the alternative spelling Lestinoidea to avoid confusion with the unrelated damselfly genus Lestoidea. However, under zoological nomenclature, Lestoidea is considered grammatically correct, and the principle of homonymy does not apply because the names belong to different zoological groups, one at superfamily rank and the other at genus rank.

== See also ==
- List of damselflies of the world
