= Amphipteryx longicaudata =

Conservation status
- Data Deficient (IUCN 3.1)

Scientific classification
- Kingdom: Animalia
- Phylum: Arthropoda
- Clade: Pancrustacea
- Class: Insecta
- Order: Odonata
- Suborder: Zygoptera
- Family: Amphipterygidae
- Genus: Amphipteryx
- Species: A. longicaudata

Binomial name
- Amphipteryx longicaudata González, 1991

Species of damselfly

Amphipteryx longicaudata was a species of damselfly in family Amphipterygidae. It is endemic to Mexico. Its natural habitats are subtropical or tropical moist montane forests and rivers. It is threatened by habitat loss. It is now a synonym of Amphipteryx agrioides.

== Sources ==
- von Ellenrieder, N. & Paulson, D. 2005. Amphipteryx longicaudata. 2006 IUCN Red List of Threatened Species. Downloaded on 9 August 2007.
