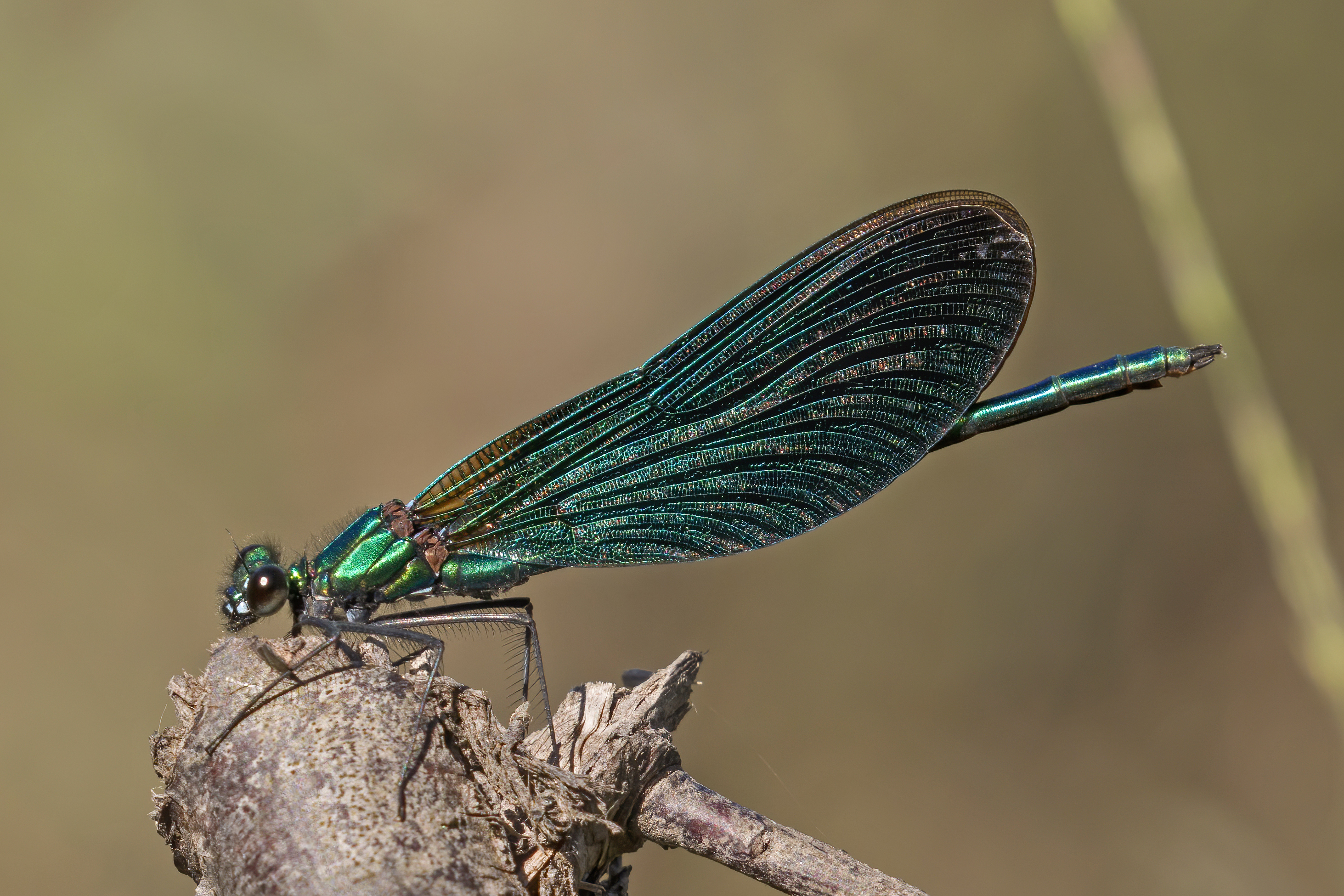
- Adult male Calopteryx virgo

Scientific classification
- Kingdom: Animalia
- Phylum: Arthropoda
- Clade: Pancrustacea
- Class: Insecta
- Order: Odonata
- Suborder: Zygoptera
- Superfamily: Calopterygoidea; Selys, 1850

Families
- Calopterygidae; Chlorocyphidae
- Distribution of Calopterygoidea

= Calopterygoidea =

Traditionally recognised superfamily of damselflies

Calopterygoidea is a superfamily of damselflies comprising the families Calopterygidae and Chlorocyphidae. Members are widely distributed, occurring on every continent except Antarctica.

The superfamily was formerly much broader, but recent phylogenetic studies led to the redistribution of most constituent families into several separate superfamilies.

== Taxonomic history ==
Selys established the "Caloptérygines" as a tribe within Agrionidae in 1850. The name was subsequently adopted at superfamily rank as Calopterygoidea, which historically served as a broad assemblage for many damselfly families that did not belong to the superfamilies Lestoidea, Platystictoidea or Coenagrionoidea.

Molecular phylogenetic and phylogenomic studies during the early 21st century demonstrated that this traditional concept of Calopterygoidea comprised several unrelated evolutionary lineages rather than a single monophyletic group.

In 2021, phylogenomic analyses by Bybee and colleagues resulted in the recognition of several new families and the reinstatement of others that had previously been included within broader concepts of Amphipterygidae and Megapodagrionidae.

Building on these results, in 2026 Carter and colleagues recognised the separate superfamilies Amphipterygoidea, Euphaeoidea, Megapodagrionoidea, Mesopodagrionoidea and Polythoroidea, restricting Calopterygoidea to the families Calopterygidae and Chlorocyphidae.

== Phylogeny ==
- Zygoptera
  - Lestoidea
  - - Platystictoidea
    - - Priscagrionoidea
      - - - Tatocnemidoidea
          - Polythoroidea
        - - - Mesopodagrionoidea
            - - Amphipterygoidea
              - Euphaeoidea
          - - - Philogangoidea
              - - Megapodagrionoidea
                - Calopterygoidea
            - Coenagrionoidea

Relationships among living damselfly superfamilies, based on Carter et al. (2026).

== Families ==
Calopterygoidea comprises two families:

- Calopterygidae Selys, 1850
- Chlorocyphidae Cowley, 1937

=== Former constituent families ===
Historically, Calopterygoidea also included:

- Amphipterygidae
- Devadattidae
- Diphlebiidae
- Euphaeidae
- Heteragrionidae
- Hypolestidae
- Lestoideidae
- Megapodagrionidae
- Mesagrionidae
- Mesopodagrionidae
- Philogeniidae
- Polythoridae
- Pseudolestidae
- Rhipidolestidae
- Thaumatoneuridae

== Fossil record ==
Fossils attributed to Calopterygoidea are known from the early Eocene onward, with records from Europe, Asia and North America. Most fossils have been assigned to living families, Calopterygidae and Chlorocyphidae, although several extinct genera are also recognised.

=== Fossil genera ===
The following fossil genera are currently assigned to Calopterygoidea:

- †Guangxicalopteryx Huang et al., 2022
- †Sinocalopteryx Lin et al., 2010
- †Epallagites Cockerell, 1925
- †Protothore Cockerell, 1930

== Etymology ==
The superfamily name Calopterygoidea is derived from the type genus Calopteryx and the zoological suffix -oidea, used for superfamilies.

The genus name Calopteryx is presumably derived from the Greek καλός (kalos, "beautiful") and πτέρυξ (pteryx, "wing"), likely referring to the broad and often brightly coloured wings of these damselflies.
