= Priscagrion =

Scientific classification
- Kingdom: Animalia
- Phylum: Arthropoda
- Clade: Pancrustacea
- Class: Insecta
- Order: Odonata
- Suborder: Zygoptera
- Superfamily: Priscagrionoidea
- Family: Priscagrionidae; Kalkman & Bybee, 2021
- Genus: Priscagrion; Zhou & Wilson, 2001

Genus of damselflies

Priscagrion is a genus of damselflies in the family Priscagrionidae. The genus is restricted to southern China and contains two described species.

Members of the genus are medium-sized to fairly large damselflies associated with forest streams. They have long legs, slender bodies and clear wings, although males possess a distinctive dark patch near the wing tips. Adults perch with their wings held outstretched and have black bodies marked with bright blue patterning, particularly towards the end of the abdomen.

When describing the genus in 2001, Zhou and Wilson regarded Priscagrion as an archaic lineage distinguished by its unusual wing venation and other morphological features. Molecular phylogenetic studies later showed that it forms a distinct lineage together with Sinocnemis, leading to the establishment of the family Priscagrionidae in 2021.

== Species ==
The following species are currently placed in Priscagrion:

- Priscagrion kiautai Zhou & Wilson, 2001
- Priscagrion pinheyi Zhou & Wilson, 2001

== Taxonomic history ==
Zhou and Wilson established Priscagrion in 2001 for two species from southern China. They considered the genus to be an archaic member of Megapodagrionidae, distinguished by numerous intercalated veins, additional antenodal cross-veins and a simple genital ligula.

Subsequent molecular studies showed that Priscagrion did not belong within Megapodagrionidae. Dijkstra et al. (2013) recognised the genus as an isolated lineage within Calopterygoidea, and Bybee et al. (2021) subsequently established the family Priscagrionidae to contain Priscagrion and the related genus Sinocnemis.

== Etymology ==
The genus name Priscagrion is derived from the Latin priscus ("ancient", "primitive" or "old") and Agrion, a historical name widely used for damselflies. The name reflects the authors' view that the genus retains several archaic features, particularly in the wing venation, which distinguished it from other genera then placed in Megapodagrionidae.
