= Epipleoneura =

Scientific classification
- Kingdom: Animalia
- Phylum: Arthropoda
- Clade: Pancrustacea
- Class: Insecta
- Order: Odonata
- Suborder: Zygoptera
- Family: Protoneuridae
- Genus: Epipleoneura; Williamson, 1915

Genus of damselflies

Epipleoneura is a genus of Neotropic damselflies in the Coenagrionidae family.

== Species ==
- Epipleoneura albuquerquei
- Epipleoneura angeloi Pessacq & Costa, 2010
- Epipleoneura capilliformis
- Epipleoneura demarmelsi
- Epipleoneura fernandezi
- Epipleoneura fuscaenea
- Epipleoneura haroldoi
- Epipleoneura humeralis
- Epipleoneura kaxuriana
- Epipleoneura lamina Williamson, 1915
- Epipleoneura machadoi
- Epipleoneura manauensis
- Epipleoneura metallica
- Epipleoneura ocuene
- Epipleoneura pallida
- Epipleoneura pereirai
- Epipleoneura peruviensis
- Epipleoneura solitaria
- Epipleoneura spatulata
- Epipleoneura tariana
- Epipleoneura uncinata
- Epipleoneura venezuelensis
- Epipleoneura waiwaiana
- Epipleoneura westfalli
- Epipleoneura williamsoni Santos
