= Epipleoneura lamina =

Scientific classification
- Domain: Eukaryota
- Kingdom: Animalia
- Phylum: Arthropoda
- Class: Insecta
- Order: Odonata
- Suborder: Zygoptera
- Family: Coenagrionidae
- Genus: Epipleoneura
- Species: E. lamina

Binomial name
- Epipleoneura lamina Williamson, 1915

Species of insect

Epipleoneura lamina is a species of damselfly in the family Coenagrionidae.

It can be in America: Guyana, Peru, and Venezuela.
