= Philoganga =

- Adult
- Nymph

Scientific classification
- Kingdom: Animalia
- Phylum: Arthropoda
- Clade: Pancrustacea
- Class: Insecta
- Order: Odonata
- Suborder: Zygoptera
- Superfamily: Philogangoidea
- Family: Philogangidae; Kennedy, 1920
- Genus: Philoganga; Kirby, 1890

Species
- Philoganga loringae; Philoganga montana; Philoganga robusta; Philoganga vetusta
- Distribution of Philoganga

Synonyms
- Anisoneura Selys, 1859

Genus of damselflies

Philoganga is a genus of damselflies in the family Philogangidae, one of two families in the superfamily Philogangoidea. The genus occurs in Southeast Asia, where its species inhabit forest streams. Philogangidae contains only the genus Philoganga and four recognised species.

Species of Philoganga are medium-sized stream-dwelling damselflies with broad wings and a metallic body colouration. They are typically found in shaded forest habitats and are among the more distinctive damselflies of tropical Asia.

== Family classification ==
Philoganga was traditionally classified in Amphipterygidae. In 1995, Novelo-Gutiérrez removed the genus from that family, considering it to be closely related to Diphlebia. Subsequent morphological and molecular studies did not support that relationship and instead indicated that Philoganga represents a distinct evolutionary lineage.

In 2014, Dijkstra and colleagues found no support for a close relationship between Philoganga and the other genera formerly associated with Amphipterygidae. They concluded that these geographically isolated lineages are best treated as separate families, recognising Philogangidae as a monogeneric family containing only Philoganga.

In 2026, Carter and colleagues recognised Philogangidae and Philosinidae as the superfamily Philogangoidea, based on phylogenomic studies that resolved the two families as a distinct lineage of damselflies.

== Species ==
The following species are currently placed in Philoganga:

- Philoganga loringae Fraser, 1927
- Philoganga montana (Hagen in Selys, 1859)
- Philoganga robusta Navás, 1936
- Philoganga vetusta Ris, 1912

== Etymology ==
The family name Philogangidae is derived from the type genus Philoganga, with the standard zoological suffix -idae used for animal families.

The genus name Philoganga is probably derived from the Greek φίλος (philos, "loving", "fond of" or "friend") and Ganga, the Sanskrit name of the river goddess Gaṅgā and the Ganges River. Kirby did not explain the derivation, but the type species was described from the Himalayas and the genus is restricted to South and Southeast Asia.
