= Sinocnemis =

Scientific classification
- Kingdom: Animalia
- Phylum: Arthropoda
- Clade: Pancrustacea
- Class: Insecta
- Order: Odonata
- Suborder: Zygoptera
- Superfamily: Priscagrionoidea
- Family: Priscagrionidae
- Genus: Sinocnemis; Wilson & Zhou, 2000

Genus of damselflies

Sinocnemis is a genus of damselflies in the family Priscagrionidae. It includes three described species found in China and northern Vietnam.

== Species ==
These three species have been assigned to the genus Sinocnemis:

- Sinocnemis dumonti Wilson & Zhou, 2000
- Sinocnemis henanese Wang, 2003
- Sinocnemis yangbingi Wilson & Zhou, 2000
