= Amphipteryx agrioides =

Conservation status
- Data Deficient (IUCN 3.1)

Scientific classification
- Kingdom: Animalia
- Phylum: Arthropoda
- Clade: Pancrustacea
- Class: Insecta
- Order: Odonata
- Suborder: Zygoptera
- Family: Amphipterygidae
- Genus: Amphipteryx
- Species: A. agrioides

Binomial name
- Amphipteryx agrioides Selys, 1853

Species of damselfly

Amphipteryx agrioides, the montane relict damsel, is a species of damselfly in family Amphipterygidae. It is found in Guatemala, Honduras, Mexico, and possibly Colombia. Its natural habitats are subtropical or tropical moist montane forests and rivers. It is threatened by habitat loss through deforestation for coffee plantations and cattle ranching.
