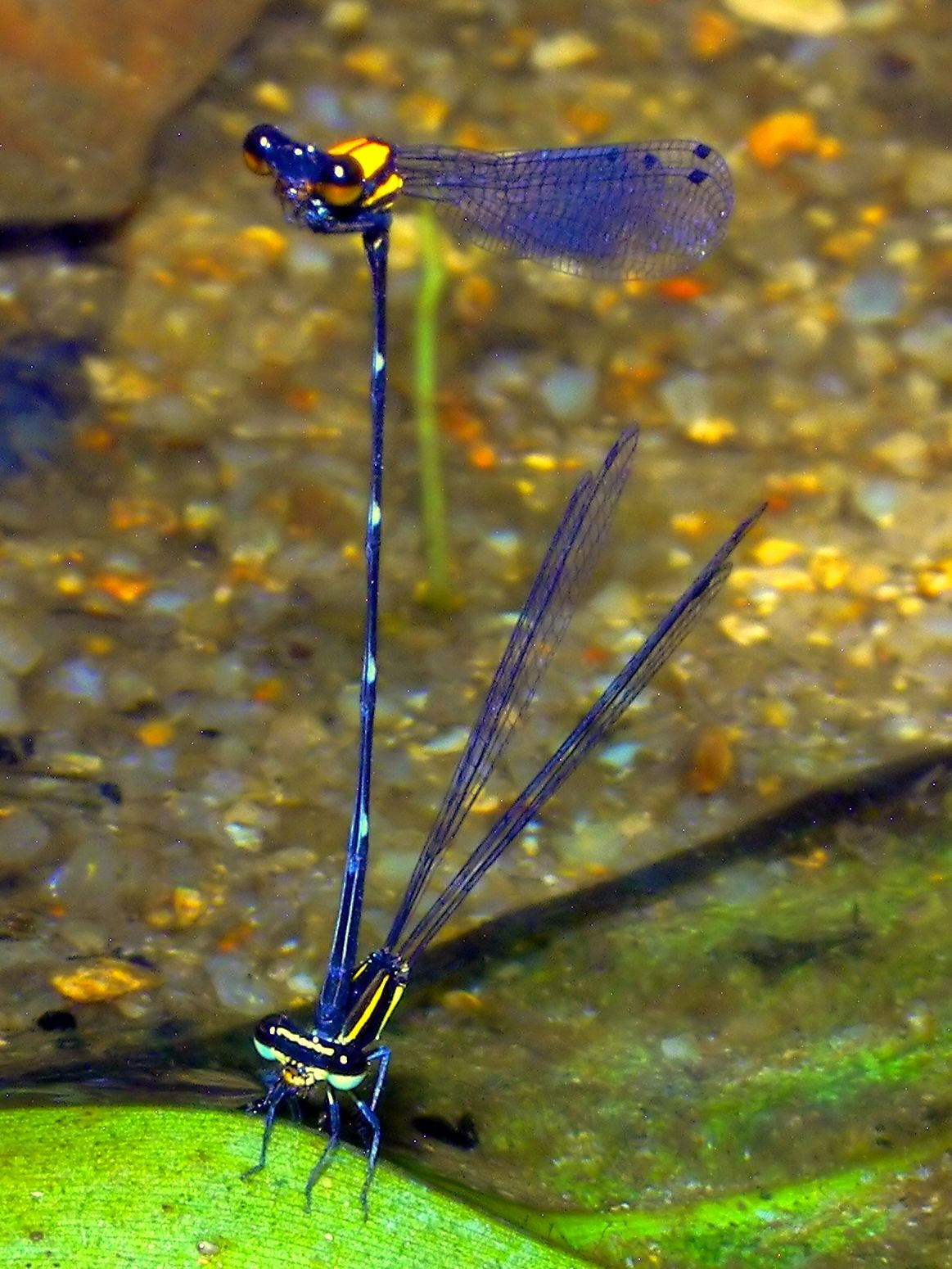

Scientific classification
- Kingdom: Animalia
- Phylum: Arthropoda
- Clade: Pancrustacea
- Class: Insecta
- Order: Odonata
- Suborder: Zygoptera
- Superfamily: Coenagrionoidea
- Family: Protoneuridae; Selys, 1860
- Distribution of Protoneuridae

= Protoneuridae =

Historical grouping of damselflies

Protoneuridae is a family of damselflies in the superfamily Coenagrionoidea. Under the classification proposed by Pessacq and colleagues (2025), the family comprises 13 genera and more than 100 species distributed throughout the Neotropical region from Mexico to Argentina and the Caribbean.

== Description ==
Members of Protoneuridae are small to medium-sized damselflies with slender bodies and narrow wings. Many species have an exceptionally thin abdomen, giving them a delicate appearance. Most inhabit shaded streams and rivers in the Neotropical region.

The larvae are aquatic and occur in flowing waters. Where known, they possess distinctive gills, a feature recognised in early classifications of the group. Adults and larvae exhibit a range of structural adaptations associated with stream habitats, although the family's defining characteristics have been revised substantially following modern phylogenetic studies.

== Taxonomic history ==
The family traces its origins to the genus Protoneura, established by Sélys in 1853 for a group of slender Neotropical damselflies. In his statistical overview of the Odonata, Selys later placed Protoneura and related genera within his "Legion Protoneura", one of several informal higher groupings used in his classification of the damselflies. The legion included genera now placed in several modern families, including Protoneuridae, Platycnemididae and Platystictidae.

Jakobson and Bianchi (1905) subsequently formalised Selys' concept as the subfamily Protoneurinae. Their treatment included both Old World and New World genera and broadly reflected the composition of Selys' Legion Protoneura. Tillyard (1917) adopted Selys' legions as subfamilies within Agrionidae and provided a detailed diagnosis of Protoneurinae based on both adult and larval characters. The World Odonata List attributes the family-group name Protoneuridae to Selys, 1860.

Fraser (1957) recognised Protoneuridae as a distinct family divided into four subfamilies: Protoneurinae, Disparoneurinae, Caconeurinae and Isostictinae. He noted that Protoneurinae comprised exclusively Neotropical genera, whereas the remaining subfamilies were restricted to the Old World, extending from tropical Africa to the Pacific.

Throughout much of the twentieth century, Protoneuridae was recognised as a widespread family of tropical damselflies. However, molecular phylogenetic studies published by Dijkstra and colleagues demonstrated that the traditional family was polyphyletic. As a result, the New World protoneurids were transferred to Coenagrionidae and the Old World protoneurids to Platycnemididae.

Subsequent molecular and morphological analyses incorporating most Neotropical genera demonstrated that, although the traditional Protoneuridae was polyphyletic, the remaining New World genera formed a well-supported monophyletic lineage distinct from the core Coenagrionidae and sister to the ridged-frons coenagrionids. Pessacq and colleagues therefore reinstated Protoneuridae in 2025, excluding the genera Proneura and Junix, which were found to belong within Coenagrionidae.

In 2026, Carter and colleagues accepted the phylogenetic results of Pessacq and colleagues, including the recognition of a distinct Neotropical lineage, but retained the group within Coenagrionidae rather than recognising Protoneuridae as a separate family. They considered that recognising Protoneuridae at family rank would leave the remaining Coenagrionidae paraphyletic.

== Genera ==
The following genera are currently placed in Protoneuridae:

- Amazoneura Machado, 2004
- Drepanoneura von Ellenrieder & Garrison, 2008
- Epipleoneura Williamson, 1915
- Epipotoneura Williamson, 1915
- Forcepsioneura Lencioni, 1999
- Idioneura Selys, 1860
- Lamproneura De Marmels, 2003
- Neoneura Selys, 1860
- Peristicta Hagen in Selys, 1860
- Phasmoneura Williamson, 1916
- Protoneura Selys in Sagra, 1857
- Psaironeura Williamson, 1915
- Roppaneura Santos, 1966

== Etymology ==
The family name Protoneuridae is derived from the type genus Protoneura, with the standard zoological suffix '-idae' used for animal families.

The generic name Protoneura is presumably formed from the Greek πρῶτος (prôtos, "first" or "primary") and νεῦρον (neûron, "nerve" or "sinew"), the latter often used in entomology to refer to a wing vein. It likely refers to the reduced and simplified wing venation emphasised in Sélys' original description of the genus.
