= Megapodagrionidae =

Scientific classification
- Kingdom: Animalia
- Phylum: Arthropoda
- Clade: Pancrustacea
- Class: Insecta
- Order: Odonata
- Suborder: Zygoptera
- Superfamily: Megapodagrionoidea
- Family: Megapodagrionidae; Tillyard, 1917

Genera
- Allopodagrion; Megapodagrion; Teinopodagrion
- Distribution of Megapodagrionidae

Family of damselflies

Megapodagrionidae is a small family of damselflies in the superfamily Megapodagrionoidea, found in tropical Central and South America. Its members are commonly known as flatwings because they typically rest with their wings spread horizontally, unlike most damselflies.

The family formerly included numerous genera from Africa, Asia, Oceania and the Americas. Molecular studies showed that these groups were not closely related, and many have since been transferred to newly recognised families, leaving Megapodagrionidae restricted to three genera.

== Description ==
Megapodagrionids are medium-sized to large damselflies with long, narrow wings that are usually held outstretched when at rest, giving them the appearance of small dragonflies. Adults are generally dark brown or black with pale markings, although colouration varies between species.

The wings are clear and have a characteristic network of fine veins, including numerous intercalated veins near the wing tips. The larvae possess distinctive caudal gills that are swollen and triangular in cross-section, ending in a slender filament.

== Distribution and habitat ==
The modern family is restricted to tropical Central and South America, where its members inhabit forest streams and rivers.

== Taxonomic history ==
Megapodagrionidae was historically a large and diverse family of damselflies containing numerous genera from the Neotropical, Afrotropical, Oriental and Oceanian regions.

In a major revision of the family, Janis Rácenis (1959) divided Megapodagrionidae into five subfamilies: Tatocnemidinae, Megapodagrioninae, Argiolestinae, Philosininae and Dysagrioninae. He further divided Megapodagrioninae into the tribes Megapodagrionini and Heteragrionini, and Argiolestinae into the tribes Austroargiolestini and Argiolestini.

Subsequent molecular phylogenetic studies showed that Megapodagrionidae, as traditionally defined, was polyphyletic. Several of the lineages recognised by Rácenis were later elevated to family rank, including Argiolestidae, Philosinidae, Protolestidae and Tatocnemididae, leaving Megapodagrionidae restricted to three genera.

The concept of Megapodagrionidae originated from the Legion Podagrion of Edmond de Sélys Longchamps, a grouping of damselflies recognised by later authors including Robert McLachlan and Philip Powell Calvert. McLachlan (1896), for example, placed his new genus Mesopodagrion within the Legion Podagrion, while Calvert (1913) discussed the composition and venation of the group in detail.

In 1917, Robin Tillyard reorganised the Zygoptera and elevated the "legions" of de Sélys to the rank of subfamilies, recognising Megapodagrioninae as a distinct subfamily within Agrionidae. This treatment was subsequently adopted by later authors, including Kennedy (1920, 1925), who used Megapodagrioninae for taxa formerly placed in de Sélys' Legion Podagrion. Megapodagrioninae was later recognised as the family Megapodagrionidae.

In 2026, Carter and colleagues recognised Megapodagrionidae and Argiolestidae as the superfamily Megapodagrionoidea, reflecting their close evolutionary relationship within the redefined classification of damselflies.

== Genera ==
The following genera are currently placed in Megapodagrionidae:

- Allopodagrion Förster, 1910
- Megapodagrion Selys, 1885
- Teinopodagrion De Marmels, 2001

== Etymology ==
The family name Megapodagrionidae is derived from the type genus Megapodagrion, with the standard zoological suffix -idae used for animal families.

The genus name Megapodagrion was introduced by Selys in 1885 as a replacement for his earlier genus name Podagrion, which was preoccupied by Podagrion Spinola, 1811, a genus of parasitic wasps. The name combines the Greek μέγας (megas, "large") with Podagrion, preserving the connection with Selys' earlier "Legion Podagrion". The root ποδ- (pod-, "foot" or "leg") refers to the long legs characteristic of these damselflies.
