= Priscagrionidae =

Scientific classification
- Kingdom: Animalia
- Phylum: Arthropoda
- Clade: Pancrustacea
- Class: Insecta
- Order: Odonata
- Suborder: Zygoptera
- Superfamily: Priscagrionoidea; Kalkman & Bybee, 2021
- Family: Priscagrionidae; Kalkman & Bybee, 2021

Type genus
- Priscagrion Zhou & Wilson, 2001

Genera
- Priscagrion; Sinocnemis
- Distribution of Priscagrionidae

Family of damselflies

Priscagrionidae is a family of damselflies found in southern China and northern Vietnam. It is the only family in the superfamily Priscagrionoidea. The family contains two genera, Priscagrion and Sinocnemis, and five recognised species.

Members of the family are medium-sized to large damselflies associated with forest streams. They have long legs, slender bodies and clear wings, although males of Priscagrion possess a distinctive dark patch near the wing tips. Adults typically perch with their wings held outstretched and have black bodies marked with blue patterning, especially towards the end of the abdomen in males.

Priscagrionidae was established in 2021 after molecular phylogenetic studies showed that Priscagrion and Sinocnemis form a distinct lineage separate from the families in which they had previously been placed.

== Genera ==
The following genera are currently placed in Priscagrionidae:

- Priscagrion Zhou & Wilson, 2001
- Sinocnemis Wilson & Zhou, 2000

== Taxonomic history ==
Sinocnemis was described in 2000 for two unusual damselflies from south-western China that did not fit comfortably within any previously recognised genus. The authors noted a number of distinctive features and regarded it as an ancient lineage within Platycnemididae.

The following year the same authors, Wen-Bao Zhou and Peter Wilson, described Priscagrion from southern China. They also considered it to be an archaic genus and placed it in Megapodagrionidae, noting similarities to several other primitive damselfly groups.

Although the two genera were initially assigned to different families, subsequent molecular studies showed that they form a distinct evolutionary lineage. In 2021, Seth Bybee and colleagues placed Priscagrion and Sinocnemis in the new family Priscagrionidae..

In 2026, Payton Carter and colleagues recognised the family as the sole member of the new superfamily Priscagrionoidea, based on phylogenomic analyses that resolved it as a distinct lineage among damselflies.

== Phylogeny ==
- Zygoptera
  - Lestoidea
  - - Platystictoidea
    - - Priscagrionoidea
      - - - Tatocnemidoidea
          - Polythoroidea
        - - - Mesopodagrionoidea
            - - Amphipterygoidea
              - Euphaeoidea
          - - - Philogangoidea
              - - Megapodagrionoidea
                - Calopterygoidea
            - Coenagrionoidea

Relationship of Priscagrionoidea among living damselfly superfamilies, based on Carter et al. (2026).

== Etymology ==
The superfamily name Priscagrionoidea is derived from the type genus Priscagrion, with the zoological suffix -oidea for superfamilies.

The family name Priscagrionidae is derived from the type genus Priscagrion, with the standard zoological suffix -idae used for animal families.

The genus name Priscagrion is derived from the Latin priscus ("ancient", "primitive" or "old") and Agrion, a historical name widely used for damselflies. Zhou and Wilson selected the name to reflect what they considered the archaic characteristics of the genus, including its wing venation and other morphological features.
