= Pseudolestes =

- Original drawing of Pseudolestes mirabilis by J. Green (delineator and lithographer)

Scientific classification
- Kingdom: Animalia
- Phylum: Arthropoda
- Clade: Pancrustacea
- Class: Insecta
- Order: Odonata
- Suborder: Zygoptera
- Superfamily: Euphaeoidea
- Family: Pseudolestidae; Fraser, 1957
- Genus: Pseudolestes; Kirby, 1900

Species
- Pseudolestes mirabilis Kirby, 1900
- Distribution of Pseudolestes

Genus of damselflies

Pseudolestes is a monotypic genus of damselflies in the family Pseudolestidae, one of three families in the superfamily Euphaeoidea. Its only species, Pseudolestes mirabilis, is endemic to Hainan Island, China.

The species inhabits forest streams and is one of the most distinctive damselflies in Asia. Adults have broad wings marked with conspicuous black and yellow patches and a slender dark abdomen, while the aquatic nymphs possess prominent abdominal gill tufts. Both the adult and larval stages differ markedly from those of most other damselflies. Pseudolestes mirabilis is assessed as Least Concern by the IUCN.

== Description ==
Pseudolestes mirabilis is a large damselfly with a slender dark body and broad wings. Adult males are readily recognised by the conspicuous black and yellow markings on the wings, which form large coloured patches across much of the wing surface.

The aquatic nymph is distinctive among damselflies in possessing prominent abdominal gill tufts. Together with a number of unusual adult and larval features, these characteristics have made Pseudolestes difficult to classify and contributed to its recognition as the sole representative of the family Pseudolestidae.

== Distribution and habitat ==
Pseudolestes mirabilis is endemic to Hainan Island in southern China, where it inhabits forest streams.

== Family classification ==
Pseudolestes mirabilis has long been regarded as an unusual damselfly whose relationships to other groups were uncertain. Its distinctive larval gill tufts resemble those of some genera formerly placed in Amphipterygidae, although it differs markedly from them in many adult and larval characters.

In his reclassification of the Odonata, Fraser (1957) established the family Pseudolestidae, named after Pseudolestes, to accommodate a number of geographically isolated and morphologically unusual damselfly genera that could not be satisfactorily placed in existing families. These included Pseudolestes, Hypolestes, Lestoidea, Rimanella and several other distinctive genera.

During the late twentieth and early twenty-first centuries, studies showed that Fraser's Pseudolestidae did not represent a natural group, but rather a collection of unrelated lineages. Dijkstra et al. (2013) concluded that the distinctive morphology of Pseudolestes mirabilis, supported by molecular evidence, warranted recognition of a separate monotypic family, Pseudolestidae.

== Etymology ==
The family name Pseudolestidae is derived from the type genus Pseudolestes, with the standard zoological suffix -idae used for animal families.

The genus name Pseudolestes is presumably derived from the Greek ψευδής (pseudēs, "false" or "deceptive") and Lestes, a genus of damselflies. Kirby noted that the insect combined features of several different damselfly groups, including wing venation resembling that of Lestes, while differing markedly in other characters.

The species name mirabilis is presumably derived from the Latin mirabilis ("wonderful", "remarkable" or "extraordinary"), referring to the unusual combination of characters that led Kirby to regard it as "the most remarkable form in the collection".
