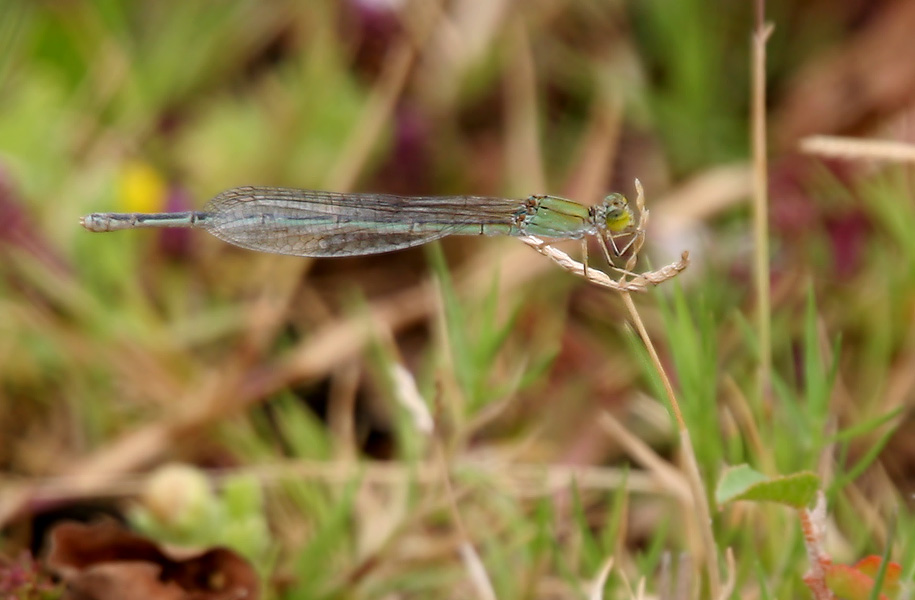
- Saffron-faced blue dart (Pseudagrion rubriceps)

Scientific classification
- Kingdom: Animalia
- Phylum: Arthropoda
- Clade: Pancrustacea
- Class: Insecta
- Order: Odonata
- Suborder: Zygoptera
- Superfamily: Coenagrionoidea; Kirby, 1890

Families
- Coenagrionidae; Isostictidae; Platycnemididae; Protoneuridae; † Burmacoenagrionidae
- Distribution of Coenagrionoidea

= Coenagrionoidea =

Superfamily of damselflies

Coenagrionoidea is a superfamily of damselflies comprising the families Coenagrionidae, Isostictidae and Platycnemididae. It is the largest superfamily of damselflies, containing more than half of all recognised species and occurring on every continent except Antarctica.

Some recent classifications have also recognised Protoneuridae as a separate family within the superfamily Coenagrionoidea, although other authorities retain its constituent genera within the family Coenagrionidae.

== Taxonomic history ==
The superfamily Coenagrionoidea was established by Kirby in 1890.

Historically, the classification of coenagrionoid damselflies varied considerably, particularly regarding the placement of the threadtail damselflies (Protoneuridae) and giant damselflies (Pseudostigmatidae).

Molecular phylogenetic studies during the early 21st century demonstrated that the traditional Protoneuridae was polyphyletic. In 2013, Dijkstra and colleagues transferred the New World protoneurids to Coenagrionidae and the Old World protoneurids to Platycnemididae, while also incorporating Pseudostigmatidae within Coenagrionidae.

Subsequent molecular and morphological analyses recovered a distinct Neotropical lineage corresponding to part of the traditional Protoneuridae. On this basis, in 2025 Pessacq and colleagues reinstated Protoneuridae as a separate family within Coenagrionoidea.

In 2026, Carter and colleagues accepted the recovered Neotropical lineage but retained it within Coenagrionidae rather than recognising Protoneuridae as a separate family.

== Phylogeny ==
- Zygoptera
  - Lestoidea
  - - Platystictoidea
    - - Priscagrionoidea
      - - - Tatocnemidoidea
          - Polythoroidea
        - - - Mesopodagrionoidea
            - - Amphipterygoidea
              - Euphaeoidea
          - - - Philogangoidea
              - - Megapodagrionoidea
                - Calopterygoidea
            - Coenagrionoidea

Relationships among living damselfly superfamilies, based on Carter et al. (2026).

== Families ==
Coenagrionoidea comprises these living families:

- Coenagrionidae Kirby, 1890
- Isostictidae Fraser, 1955
- Platycnemididae Jakobson and Bianchi, 1905

Some recent classifications instead recognise the Neotropical lineage Protoneuridae as a fourth family within Coenagrionoidea.

- Protoneuridae Selys, 1860

== Fossil record ==
The extinct family †Burmacoenagrionidae is known from Cretaceous Burmese amber deposits.

=== Fossil genera ===
The following fossil genera are currently assigned to Coenagrionoidea:

- †Balticoagrion Bechly, 2012
- †Hispanocoenagrion Nel et al., 1997

== Etymology ==
The superfamily name Coenagrionoidea is derived from the type genus Coenagrion and the zoological suffix -oidea, used for superfamilies.

The genus name Coenagrion is derived from the Greek κοινός (koinos, "common" or "shared") and Agrion, an early generic name historically applied to damselflies.

== See also ==
- List of damselflies of the world (Coenagrionidae)
