= Polythoroidea =

Scientific classification
- Kingdom: Animalia
- Phylum: Arthropoda
- Clade: Pancrustacea
- Class: Insecta
- Order: Odonata
- Suborder: Zygoptera
- Superfamily: Polythoroidea; Munz, 1919

Families
- Dicteriadidae; Heteragrionidae; Hypolestidae; Mesagrionidae; Philogeniidae; Polythoridae; Rimanellidae
- Distribution of Polythoroidea

Superfamily of damselflies

Polythoroidea is a superfamily of damselflies comprising the families Dicteriadidae, Heteragrionidae, Hypolestidae, Mesagrionidae, Philogeniidae, Polythoridae and Rimanellidae. Together they comprise more about 200 recognised species distributed throughout the Neotropical realm, with one family confined to the Greater Antilles.

Members of the superfamily are predominantly stream-dwelling damselflies. Many species rest with their wings partly or fully outspread, and several families possess distinctive larval gill structures and unusual wing venation that have long attracted taxonomic interest.

== Taxonomic history ==
The families now placed in Polythoroidea have had varied taxonomic histories. Most were formerly included within broadly defined families such as Megapodagrionidae, Amphipterygidae or Pseudolestidae, whereas Dicteriadidae and Polythoridae have long been recognised as distinct lineages.

Morphological and molecular studies progressively demonstrated that these predominantly Neotropical families represent several closely related evolutionary lineages distinct from other damselflies. In 2026, Carter and colleagues recognised these lineages as the superfamily Polythoroidea.

== Phylogeny ==
- Zygoptera
  - Lestoidea
  - - Platystictoidea
    - - Priscagrionoidea
      - - - Tatocnemidoidea
          - Polythoroidea
        - - - Mesopodagrionoidea
            - - Amphipterygoidea
              - Euphaeoidea
          - - - Philogangoidea
              - - Megapodagrionoidea
                - Calopterygoidea
            - Coenagrionoidea

Relationships among living damselfly superfamilies, based on Carter et al. (2026).

== Families ==
The following families are currently placed in Polythoroidea:

- Dicteriadidae Selys, 1853
- Heteragrionidae Rácenis, 1959
- Hypolestidae Tillyard & Fraser, 1938
- Mesagrionidae Kalkman & Sanchez Herrera, 2021
- Philogeniidae Rácenis, 1959
- Polythoridae Munz, 1919
- Rimanellidae Davies & Tobin, 1984

== Etymology ==
The superfamily name Polythoroidea is derived from the genus Polythore, with the standard zoological suffix -oidea used for animal superfamilies.

The genus name Polythore was introduced by Calvert in 1917 as a replacement for Thore Selys, 1853, which was preoccupied by a name previously used for a genus of spiders. Calvert stated that the name Polythore refers to the denser wing venation of its members compared with other genera in the group.
