= Amphipterygoidea =

Scientific classification
- Kingdom: Animalia
- Phylum: Arthropoda
- Clade: Pancrustacea
- Class: Insecta
- Order: Odonata
- Suborder: Zygoptera
- Superfamily: Amphipterygoidea; Selys, 1853

Families
- Amphipterygidae; Devadattidae; Rhipidolestidae; Thaumatoneuridae
- Distribution of Amphipterygoidea

Superfamily of damselflies

Amphipterygoidea is a superfamily of damselflies comprising the families Amphipterygidae, Devadattidae, Rhipidolestidae and Thaumatoneuridae. Together they comprise eight genera and about 60 recognised species distributed in Mesoamerica and eastern Asia.

== Taxonomic history ==
The families now placed in Amphipterygoidea have had varied taxonomic histories. Amphipterygidae formerly included numerous geographically isolated genera from Asia, Africa and the Americas, while Devadattidae was traditionally included within Amphipterygidae, Rhipidolestidae within Megapodagrionidae or Pseudolestidae, and Thaumatoneuridae within Pseudolestidae.

Morphological and molecular studies demonstrated that these traditional family concepts did not represent natural evolutionary groups. In 2026, Carter and colleagues recognised Amphipterygoidea to unite Amphipterygidae, Devadattidae, Rhipidolestidae and Thaumatoneuridae as a distinct superfamily of damselflies.

== Phylogeny ==
- Zygoptera
  - Lestoidea
  - - Platystictoidea
    - - Priscagrionoidea
      - - - Tatocnemidoidea
          - Polythoroidea
        - - - Mesopodagrionoidea
            - - Amphipterygoidea
              - Euphaeoidea
          - - - Philogangoidea
              - - Megapodagrionoidea
                - Calopterygoidea
            - Coenagrionoidea

Relationships among living damselfly superfamilies, based on Carter et al. (2026).

== Families ==
The following families are currently placed in Amphipterygoidea:

- Amphipterygidae – a monogeneric family represented by Amphipteryx, found in Mesoamerica.
- Devadattidae – a monogeneric family represented by Devadatta, distributed in Southeast Asia.
- Rhipidolestidae – four genera occurring in eastern and southeastern Asia.
- Thaumatoneuridae – two genera inhabiting forest streams of Mesoamerica.

== Etymology ==
The superfamily name Amphipterygoidea is derived from the type genus Amphipteryx, with the standard zoological suffix -oidea used for animal superfamilies.

The genus name Amphipteryx is presumably derived from the Greek ἀμφί (amphi, "both", "double" or "on both sides") and πτέρυξ (pteryx, "wing"). Although Selys did not explain the name in the original description, the genus was established on the basis of distinctive wing and wing-venation characters.
