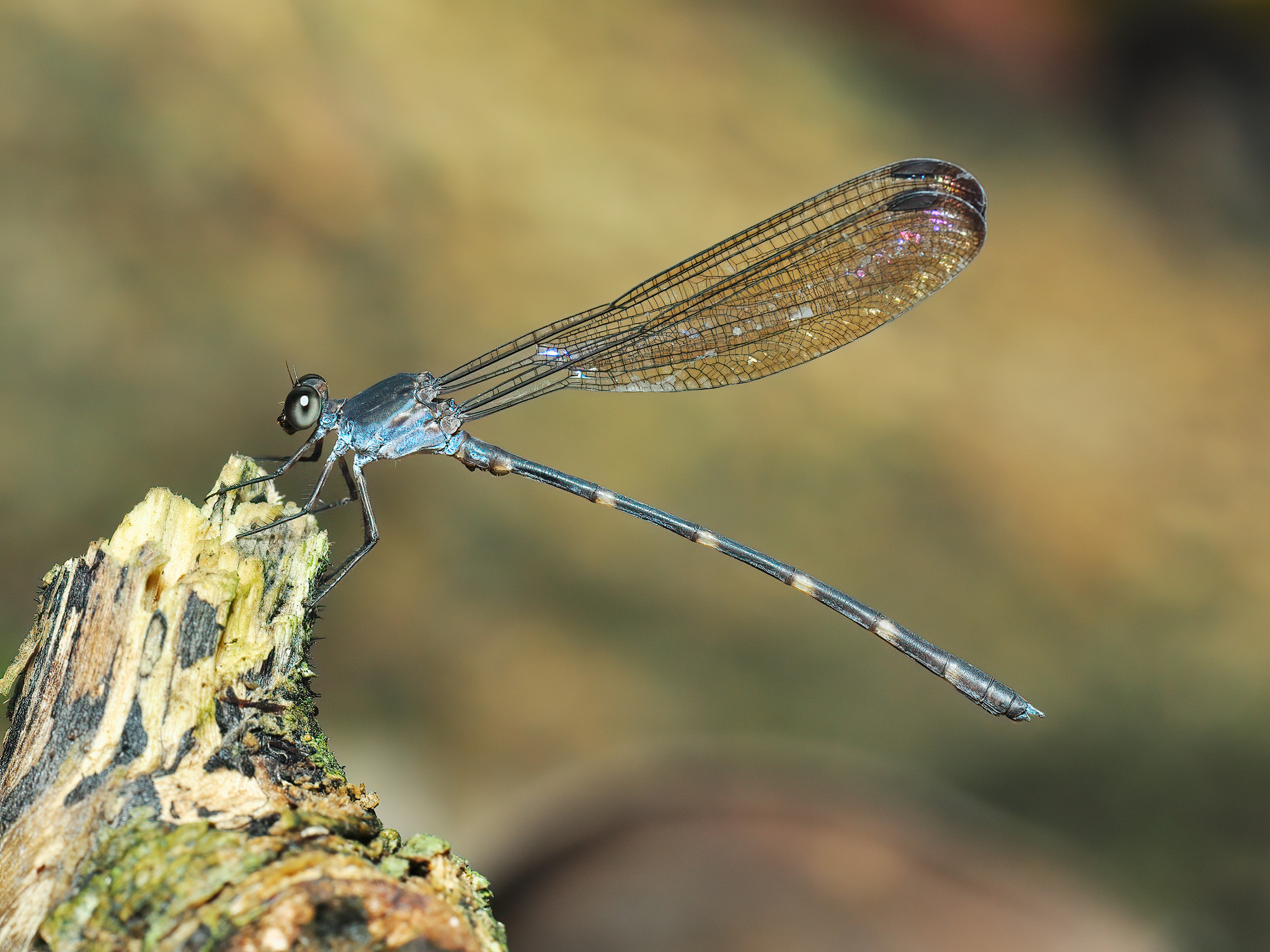
- Devadatta argyoides

Scientific classification
- Kingdom: Animalia
- Phylum: Arthropoda
- Clade: Pancrustacea
- Class: Insecta
- Order: Odonata
- Suborder: Zygoptera
- Superfamily: Amphipterygoidea
- Family: Devadattidae; Dijkstra, Kalkman, Dow, Stokvis & van Tol, 2014
- Genus: Devadatta; Kirby, 1890
- Distribution of Devadatta

Synonyms
- Tetraneura Selys, 1859

= Devadatta (damselfly) =

Genus of damselflies

Devadatta is a genus of damselflies in the family Devadattidae, which is a family in the superfamily Amphipterygoidea. Species of Devadatta inhabit forest streams in Southeast Asia, with the greatest diversity occurring in Borneo. The family Devadattidae contains only the genus Devadatta and about 13 described species.

Members of the genus are medium-sized damselflies characterised by their broad wings and distinctive wing venation. They are typically found in shaded forest habitats and are often associated with small streams.

== Family classification ==
The genus Devadatta was established by Kirby in 1890 as a replacement for Tetraneura Selys, 1859, a preoccupied name. It was subsequently classified within Amphipterygidae, a family that included several geographically isolated genera from Asia, Africa and the Americas.

Morphological and molecular studies questioned the relationships among the genera traditionally placed in Amphipterygidae. In 2014, Dijkstra and colleagues recognised these lineages as separate families, establishing Devadattidae for Devadatta. Subsequent phylogenomic analyses supported the recognition of Devadattidae as a distinct family of damselflies.

In 2014, Dijkstra and colleagues concluded that these lineages are best treated as separate families and established Devadattidae for the genus Devadatta. Subsequent phylogenomic analyses supported the recognition of Devadattidae as a distinct family of damselflies.

== Species ==
The following species are currently placed in Devadatta:

- Devadatta aran Dow, Hämäläinen & Stokvis, 2015
- Devadatta argyoides (Selys, 1859)
- Devadatta basilanensis Laidlaw, 1934
- Devadatta clavicauda Dow, Hämäläinen & Stokvis, 2015
- Devadatta cyanocephala Hämäläinen, Sasamoto & Karube, 2006
- Devadatta ducatrix Lieftinck, 1969
- Devadatta glaucinotata Sasamoto, 2003
- Devadatta kompieri Phan, Sasamoto & Hayashi, 2015
- Devadatta multinervosa Fraser, 1933
- Devadatta podolestoides Laidlaw, 1934
- Devadatta sokoh Dow, Hämäläinen & Stokvis, 2015
- Devadatta tanduk Dow, Hämäläinen & Stokvis, 2015
- Devadatta yokoii Phan, Sasamoto & Hayashi, 2015

== Etymology ==
The family name Devadattidae is derived from the type genus Devadatta, with the standard zoological suffix -idae used for animal families.

The genus name Devadatta was introduced by Kirby in 1890 as a replacement name for Tetraneura Selys, 1859, which was preoccupied. Kirby did not explain the derivation of the name. It is probably derived from the Sanskrit देवदत्त (Devadatta), meaning "given by the gods" or "god-given".
