= Philogangoidea =

- Philoganga sp., a philogangid
- Rhinagrion viridatum, a philosinid

Scientific classification
- Kingdom: Animalia
- Phylum: Arthropoda
- Clade: Pancrustacea
- Class: Insecta
- Order: Odonata
- Suborder: Zygoptera
- Superfamily: Philogangoidea; Kennedy, 1920

Families
- Philogangidae; Philosinidae
- Distribution of Philogangoidea

Superfamily of damselflies

Philogangoidea is a superfamily of damselflies found in South and Southeast Asia. It comprises the families Philogangidae and Philosinidae, together containing three genera and 17 recognised species.

Members of the superfamily are medium-sized to large damselflies associated mainly with shaded forest streams. They generally have dark bodies with contrasting coloured markings and hold their wings open when at rest.

== Taxonomic history ==
Philogangidae and Philosinidae were formerly placed within broader groupings such as Amphipterygidae, Megapodagrionidae and Calopterygoidea. Morphological and molecular studies later showed that both families represent distinct lineages.

In 2026, Carter and colleagues recognised Philogangidae and Philosinidae together as the superfamily Philogangoidea, following phylogenomic studies of damselfly relationships.

== Phylogeny ==
- Zygoptera
  - Lestoidea
  - - Platystictoidea
    - - Priscagrionoidea
      - - - Tatocnemidoidea
          - Polythoroidea
        - - - Mesopodagrionoidea
            - - Amphipterygoidea
              - Euphaeoidea
          - - - Philogangoidea
              - - Megapodagrionoidea
                - Calopterygoidea
            - Coenagrionoidea

Relationships among living damselfly superfamilies, based on Carter et al. (2026).

== Families ==
The following families are placed in Philogangoidea:

- Philogangidae Kennedy, 1920
- Philosinidae Kennedy, 1925

== Etymology ==
The superfamily name Philogangoidea is derived from the type genus Philoganga, with the standard zoological suffix -oidea used for animal families.

The genus name Philoganga is probably derived from the Greek φίλος (philos, "loving", "fond of" or "friend") and Ganga, the Sanskrit name of the river goddess Gaṅgā and the Ganges River. Kirby did not explain the derivation, but the type species was described from the Himalayas and the genus is restricted to South and Southeast Asia.
