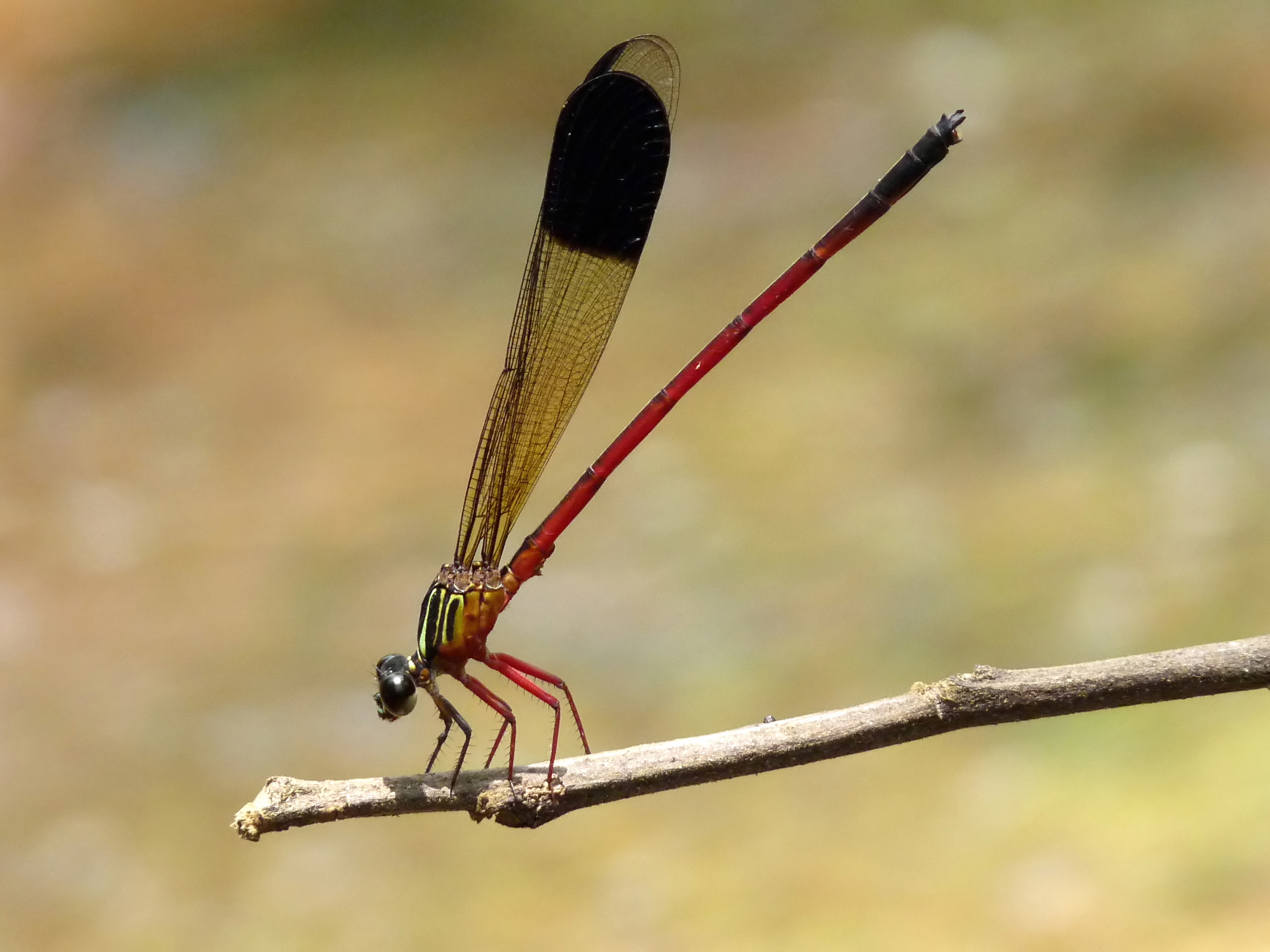
- Euphaea fraseri, male

Scientific classification
- Kingdom: Animalia
- Phylum: Arthropoda
- Clade: Pancrustacea
- Class: Insecta
- Order: Odonata
- Suborder: Zygoptera
- Superfamily: Euphaeoidea; Selys, 1853

Families
- Euphaeidae; Lestoideidae; Pseudolestidae
- Distribution of Euphaeoidea

= Euphaeoidea =

Superfamily of damselflies

Euphaeoidea is a superfamily of damselflies comprising the families Euphaeidae, Lestoideidae and Pseudolestidae. Together they include 12 genera and about 90 recognised species distributed from southern Europe across tropical Asia to New Guinea and Australia.

Members of the superfamily are predominantly stream-dwelling damselflies. They include the large, metallic gossamerwings (Euphaeidae), the Australian rockmasters and bluestreaks (Lestoideidae), and the distinctive monotypic family Pseudolestidae from Hainan Island, China.

== Taxonomic history ==
The name Euphaeoidea ultimately derives from Sélys's "Legion Euphaea", established in 1853 for a group of damselflies centred on the genus Euphaea. Jakobson and Bianchi subsequently used the family-group name Euphaeinae in 1905. The name is now attributed to Sélys, 1853.

The families now placed in Euphaeoidea have long been recognised as close relatives. Morphological and molecular studies identified a close relationship between Euphaeidae and Lestoideidae, while later molecular analyses placed Pseudolestidae within the same evolutionary lineage.

In 2026, Carter and colleagues recognised this lineage as the superfamily Euphaeoidea, comprising Euphaeidae, Lestoideidae and Pseudolestidae. This arrangement is followed by the World Odonata List.

== Phylogeny ==
- Zygoptera
  - Lestoidea
  - - Platystictoidea
    - - Priscagrionoidea
      - - - Tatocnemidoidea
          - Polythoroidea
        - - - Mesopodagrionoidea
            - - Amphipterygoidea
              - Euphaeoidea
          - - - Philogangoidea
              - - Megapodagrionoidea
                - Calopterygoidea
            - Coenagrionoidea

Relationships among living damselfly superfamilies, based on Carter et al. (2026).

== Families ==
The following families are currently placed in Euphaeoidea:

- Euphaeidae Selys, 1853
- Lestoideidae Munz, 1919
- Pseudolestidae Fraser, 1957

== Etymology ==
The superfamily name Euphaeoidea is derived from the type genus Euphaea, with the standard zoological suffix -oidea used for animal superfamilies.

The genus name Euphaea is presumably derived from the Greek εὐφαιής (euphaēs), meaning "splendid", "beautiful" or "radiant", likely referring to the striking appearance of these damselflies and the metallic colours displayed by many species.
