= Megapodagrionoidea =

Scientific classification
- Kingdom: Animalia
- Phylum: Arthropoda
- Clade: Pancrustacea
- Class: Insecta
- Order: Odonata
- Suborder: Zygoptera
- Superfamily: Megapodagrionoidea; Tillyard, 1917

Families
- Argiolestidae; Megapodagrionidae
- Distribution of Megapodagrionoidea

Superfamily of damselflies

Megapodagrionoidea is a superfamily of damselflies comprising the families Argiolestidae and Megapodagrionidae. Together they include about 20 genera and more than 150 recognised species distributed in the Neotropical and Australasian regions.

Members of the superfamily are commonly known as flatwings because adults typically perch with their wings held outstretched rather than folded above the abdomen. Most species inhabit forest streams and other freshwater habitats.

== Taxonomic history ==
The families now placed in Megapodagrionoidea were formerly united within a broadly defined Megapodagrionidae, which for much of the twentieth century included numerous genera from the Americas, Africa, Asia and Australasia.

Morphological and molecular studies showed that this broad concept of Megapodagrionidae was polyphyletic and comprised several unrelated evolutionary lineages. As a result, many former members were transferred to newly recognised families, leaving Megapodagrionidae restricted to a small Neotropical lineage and recognising Argiolestidae as a distinct Australasian family.

In 2026, Carter and colleagues subsequently recognised these two families as the superfamily Megapodagrionoidea.

== Phylogeny ==
- Zygoptera
  - Lestoidea
  - - Platystictoidea
    - - Priscagrionoidea
      - - - Tatocnemidoidea
          - Polythoroidea
        - - - Mesopodagrionoidea
            - - Amphipterygoidea
              - Euphaeoidea
          - - - Philogangoidea
              - - Megapodagrionoidea
                - Calopterygoidea
            - Coenagrionoidea

Relationships among living damselfly superfamilies, based on Carter et al. (2026).

== Families ==
The following families are currently placed in Megapodagrionoidea:

- Argiolestidae Fraser, 1957
- Megapodagrionidae Selys, 1853

== Etymology ==
The superfamily name Megapodagrionoidea is derived from the type genus Megapodagrion, with the standard zoological suffix -oidea used for animal superfamilies.

The genus name Megapodagrion was introduced by Selys in 1885 as a replacement for his earlier genus name Podagrion, which was preoccupied by Podagrion Spinola, 1811, a genus of parasitic wasps. The name combines the Greek μέγας (megas, "large") with Podagrion, preserving the connection with Selys' earlier "Legion Podagrion". The root ποδ- (pod-, "foot" or "leg") refers to the long legs characteristic of these damselflies.
