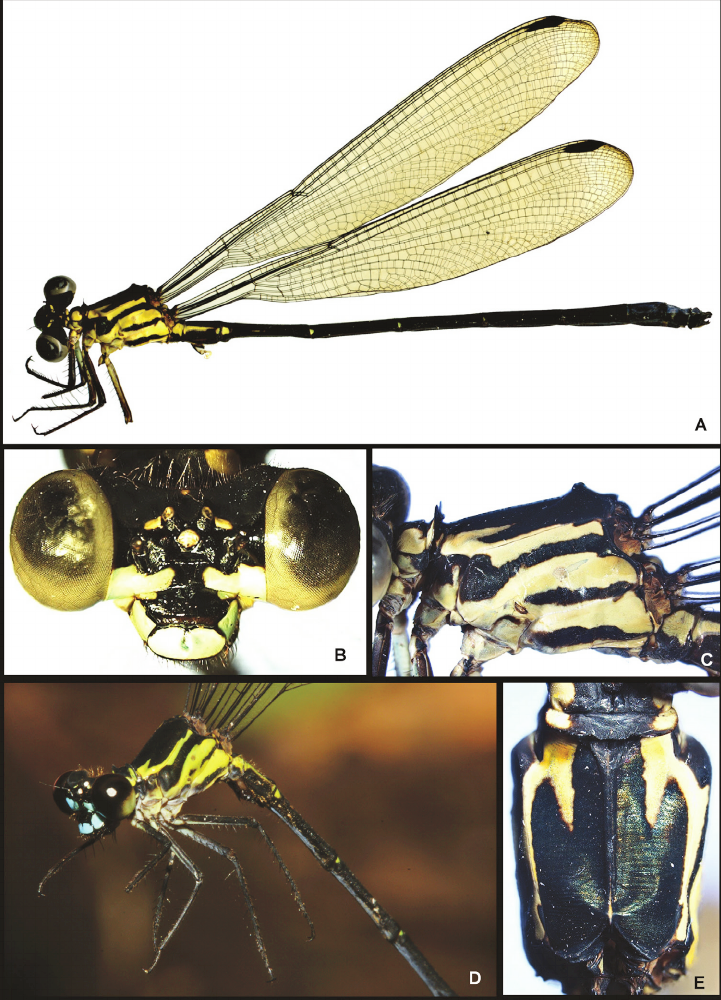
- Images of Amphipteryx jaroli (A–E), whole male holotype dead and preserved (A), frontal view head (B), lateral pterothorax (C), live male in the field (D) and dorsal pterothorax (E)

Scientific classification
- Kingdom: Animalia
- Phylum: Arthropoda
- Clade: Pancrustacea
- Class: Insecta
- Order: Odonata
- Suborder: Zygoptera
- Superfamily: Amphipterygoidea
- Family: Amphipterygidae; Selys, 1853
- Genus: Amphipteryx; Selys, 1853

Species
- Amphipteryx agrioides; Amphipteryx chiapensis; Amphipteryx jaroli; Amphipteryx meridionalis; Amphipteryx nataliae
- Distribution of Amphipteryx

= Amphipteryx =

Genus of damselflies

Amphipteryx is the sole genus of damselflies in the family Amphipterygidae, which is a family in the superfamily Amphipterygoidea. The genus is restricted to Mesoamerica, where its species inhabit tropical rainforests and cloud forests from Mexico to Honduras.

Amphipterygidae contains only the genus Amphipteryx, making it one of several small damselfly families recognised in modern classifications. Species are typically associated with shaded seeps and forest streams, while the larvae live amongst gravel and leaf litter in flowing water.

== Family classification ==
Selys established the "legion Amphipteryx" in 1853, from which the family-group name Amphipterygidae is derived. In 1917, Tillyard recognised Amphipterygini as a tribe within the subfamily Epallaginae of Calopterygidae. Although some subsequent classifications attribute Amphipterygidae to Tillyard, 1917, the World Odonata List recognises Selys, 1853 as the authority for the family. Selys originally included two species in Amphipteryx, one of which (Amphipteryx lestoides) was later transferred to the genus Lestoidea and is no longer considered closely related to Amphipteryx.

For much of the twentieth century, Amphipterygidae included several geographically isolated genera from Central America, South America, Africa and Asia. In 1995, Novelo-Gutiérrez removed Diphlebia and Philoganga from the family, and subsequent morphological and molecular studies found little support for relationships among the remaining genera.

In 2014, Dijkstra and colleagues concluded that these lineages are best treated as separate families. Under this classification Amphipterygidae is restricted to the genus Amphipteryx, while genera formerly associated with the family are placed in Devadattidae, Philogangidae, Pentaphlebiidae, Pseudolestidae and Rimanellidae.

== Species ==
The following species are currently placed in Amphipteryx:

- Amphipteryx agrioides Selys, 1853
- Amphipteryx chiapensis González, 2010
- Amphipteryx jaroli Jocque & Argueta, 2014
- Amphipteryx meridionalis González, 2010
- Amphipteryx nataliae González, 2010

== Etymology ==
The family name Amphipterygidae is derived from the type genus Amphipteryx, with the standard zoological suffix -idae used for animal families.

The genus name Amphipteryx is derived from the Greek ἀμφί (amphi, "both", "double" or "on both sides") and πτέρυξ (pteryx, "wing"). Although Edmond de Sélys Longchamps did not explain the name in the original description, the genus was established on the basis of distinctive wing and wing-venation characters.
