= Edonis helena =

Scientific classification
- Kingdom: Animalia
- Phylum: Arthropoda
- Clade: Pancrustacea
- Class: Insecta
- Order: Odonata
- Infraorder: Anisoptera
- Family: Libellulidae
- Genus: Edonis; Needham, 1905
- Species: E. helena

Binomial name
- Edonis helena Needham, 1905

Species of dragonfly

Edonis helena is a species of dragonfly in the family Libellulidae, and is the only species in the genus Edonis. It is a small dragonfly, 29.3–32 millimetres (1.15–1.26 in) long, with a broad orange spot on the base of the hind-wing. It occurs from southern Brazil to northeastern Argentina.
