= Rimanella =

Scientific classification
- Kingdom: Animalia
- Phylum: Arthropoda
- Clade: Pancrustacea
- Class: Insecta
- Order: Odonata
- Suborder: Zygoptera
- Superfamily: Polythoroidea
- Family: Rimanellidae; Davies & Tobin, 1984
- Genus: Rimanella; Needham, 1934
- Species: R. arcana

Binomial name
- Rimanella arcana (Needham, 1933)
- Distribution of Rimanella

Genus of damselflies

Rimanella is a monotypic genus of damselflies and the only genus in the family Rimanellidae, which is placed in the superfamily Polythoroidea. Its only species, Rimanella arcana, is endemic to the Guiana Highlands of northern South America.

Rimanella arcana, known as the Pantepui relict damsel, inhabits streams and waterfalls in the tepui region of Venezuela, Guyana, Suriname and northern Brazil. It is a distinctive damselfly with narrow transparent wings, a slender dark body and unusual wing venation. The species is assessed as Least Concern by the IUCN.

== Description ==
The sole species, Rimanella arcana is a medium-sized damselfly with a wingspan of about 30 mm and a slender body approximately 41 mm long. Adults are predominantly dark greenish-black and brown, with a yellow face, brown thorax and transparent wings bearing a brown pterostigma.

When describing the genus, Needham noted that its wing venation differed markedly from that of other known damselflies and considered it most closely related to the genera Megalestes and Hypolestes, while differing from both in several important characters.

== Family classification ==
Needham described the species in 1933 as Rima arcana from material collected on Mount Duida in Venezuela. The following year he replaced the genus name with Rimanella after discovering that Rima was already in use for another animal genus.

For much of the twentieth century, Rimanella was included in Amphipterygidae together with several geographically isolated genera from Central America, Africa and Asia. Fraser (1957) later transferred the genus to Pseudolestidae, a family created to accommodate a number of morphologically unusual damselfly genera whose relationships were uncertain.

Novelo-Gutiérrez (1995) observed similarities between the larvae of Rimanella and the African genus Pentaphlebia, particularly the distinctive gill tufts, and placed the two genera together in the subfamily Pentaphlebiinae. Subsequent morphological and molecular studies showed that the traditional concept of Amphipterygidae did not represent a natural group.

Modern classifications recognise Rimanellidae as a distinct monogeneric family containing only Rimanella arcana.

In 2026, Carter and colleagues placed Rimanellidae within the newly recognised superfamily Polythoroidea, together with Dicteriadidae, Heteragrionidae, Hypolestidae, Mesagrionidae, Philogeniidae and Polythoridae, reflecting phylogenomic evidence for the relationships among these predominantly Neotropical damselfly lineages.

== Etymology ==
Needham originally named the genus Rima in 1933. He explained that the name was taken from Rima, the heroine of William Henry Hudson's Venezuelan novel Green Mansions. Because the generic name was already occupied, Needham introduced the replacement name Rimanella in 1934, retaining the original stem of the name.

The species name arcana is derived from the Latin arcanus ("hidden", "secret" or "mysterious"), possibly referring to the remote and little-known region in which the species was discovered.
