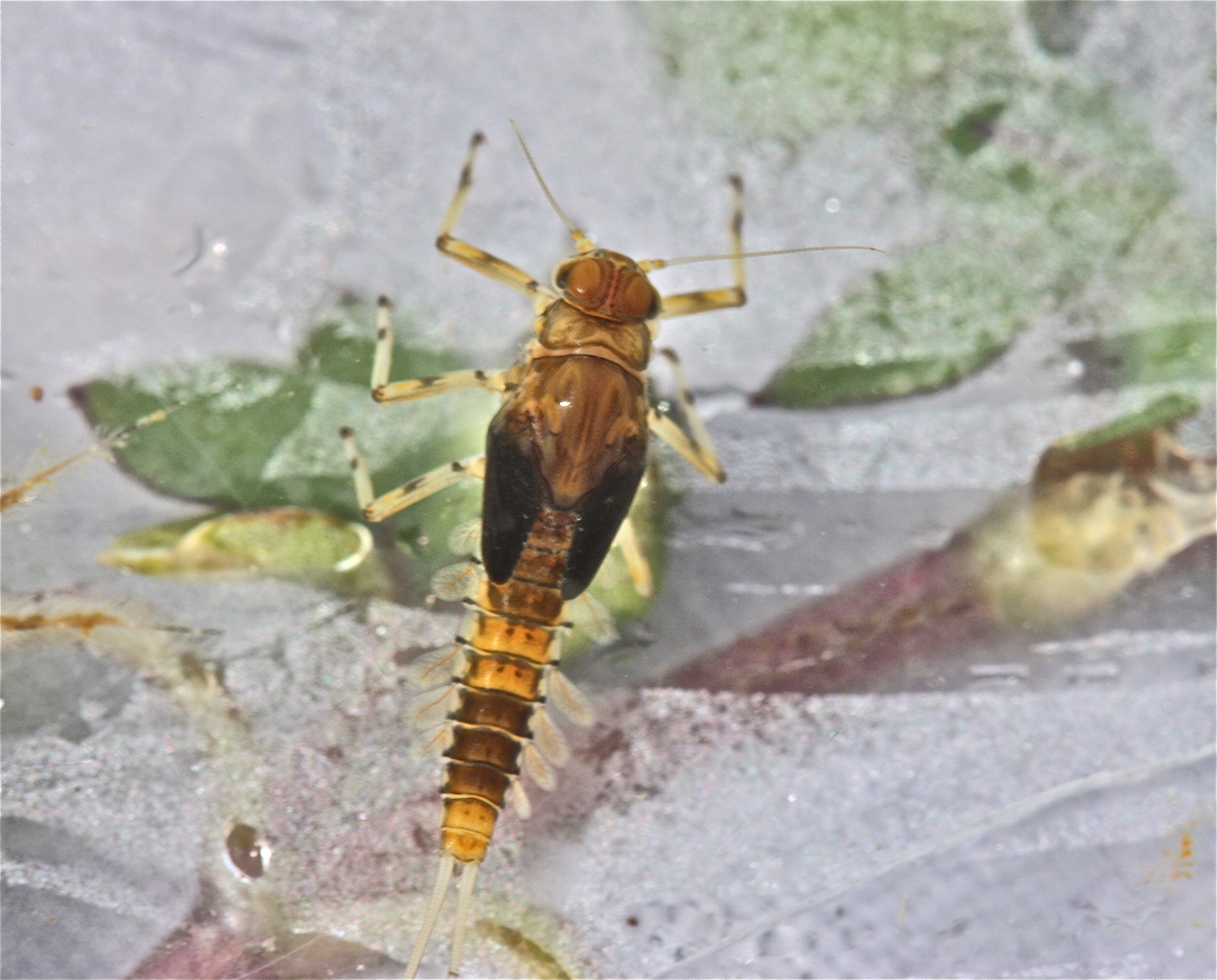

Scientific classification
- Domain: Eukaryota
- Kingdom: Animalia
- Phylum: Arthropoda
- Class: Insecta
- Order: Ephemeroptera
- Family: Baetidae
- Genus: Heterocloeon
- Species: H. amplum

Binomial name
- Heterocloeon amplum (Traver, 1932)

Synonyms
- Acentrella ampla Traver, 1932

= Heterocloeon amplum =

Species of mayfly

Heterocloeon amplum is a species of small minnow mayfly in the family Baetidae. It is found in Central America and North America. In North America its range includes northern Mexico, the southern and northeastern United States.
