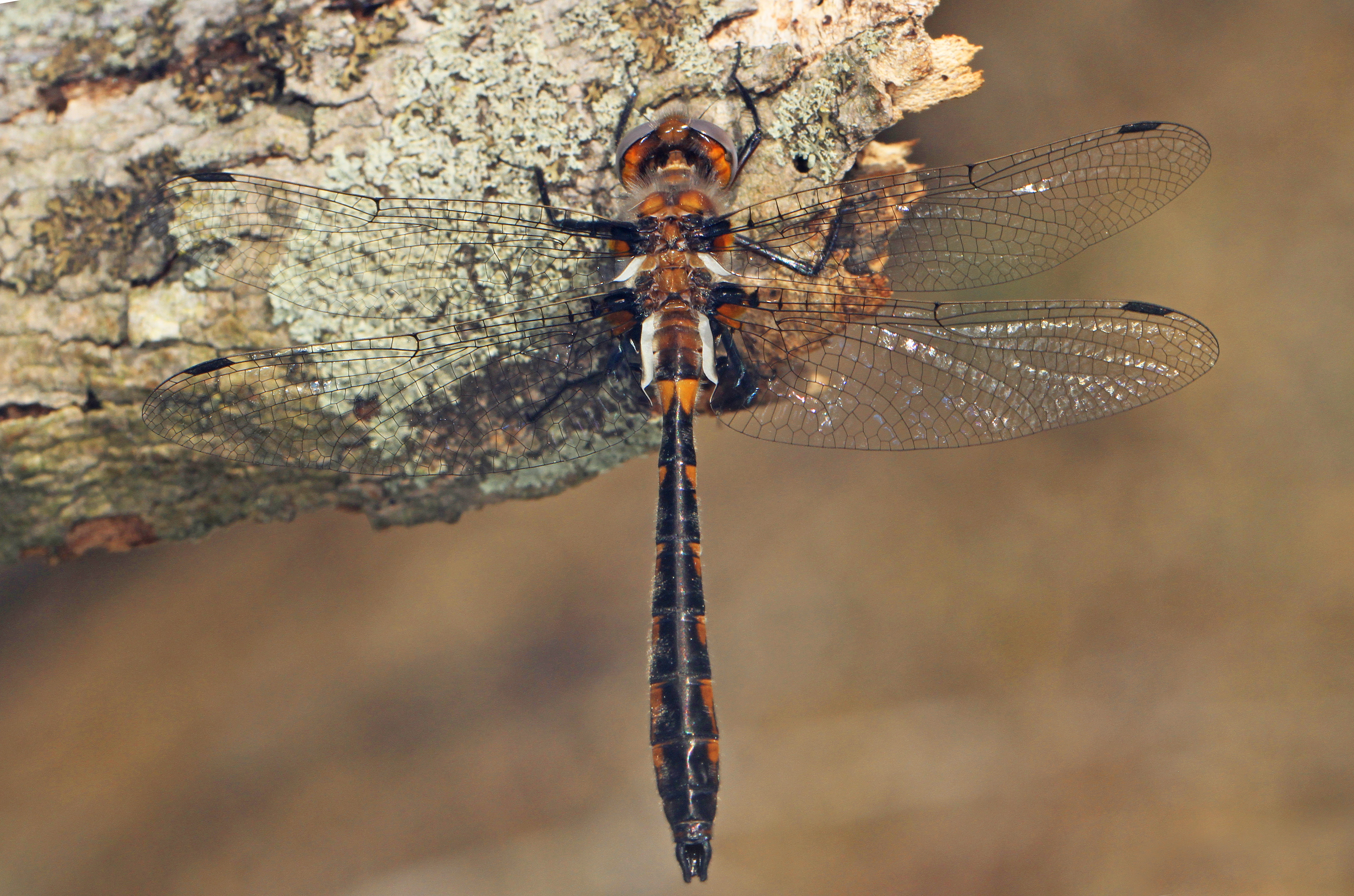
- Helocordulia uhleri

Scientific classification
- Kingdom: Animalia
- Phylum: Arthropoda
- Clade: Pancrustacea
- Class: Insecta
- Order: Odonata
- Infraorder: Anisoptera
- Family: Corduliidae
- Subfamily: Corduliinae
- Genus: Helocordulia; Needham, 1901

= Helocordulia =

Genus of dragonflies

Helocordulia is a genus of dragonfly in the family Corduliidae. They are commonly known as sundragons.

These are medium-sized odonates, 38–46 mm (1.5–1.8 in) long, dark brown with orange markings. They are confined to eastern USA and Canada where their habitat is clear streams and lakes with sandy bottoms.

== Species ==
The genus contains only two species:

Image	Scientific name	Common name	Distribution
	Helocordulia selysii (Hagen in Selys, 1878)	Selys's sundragon	North America
	Helocordulia uhleri (Selys, 1871)	Uhler's sundragon	North America
