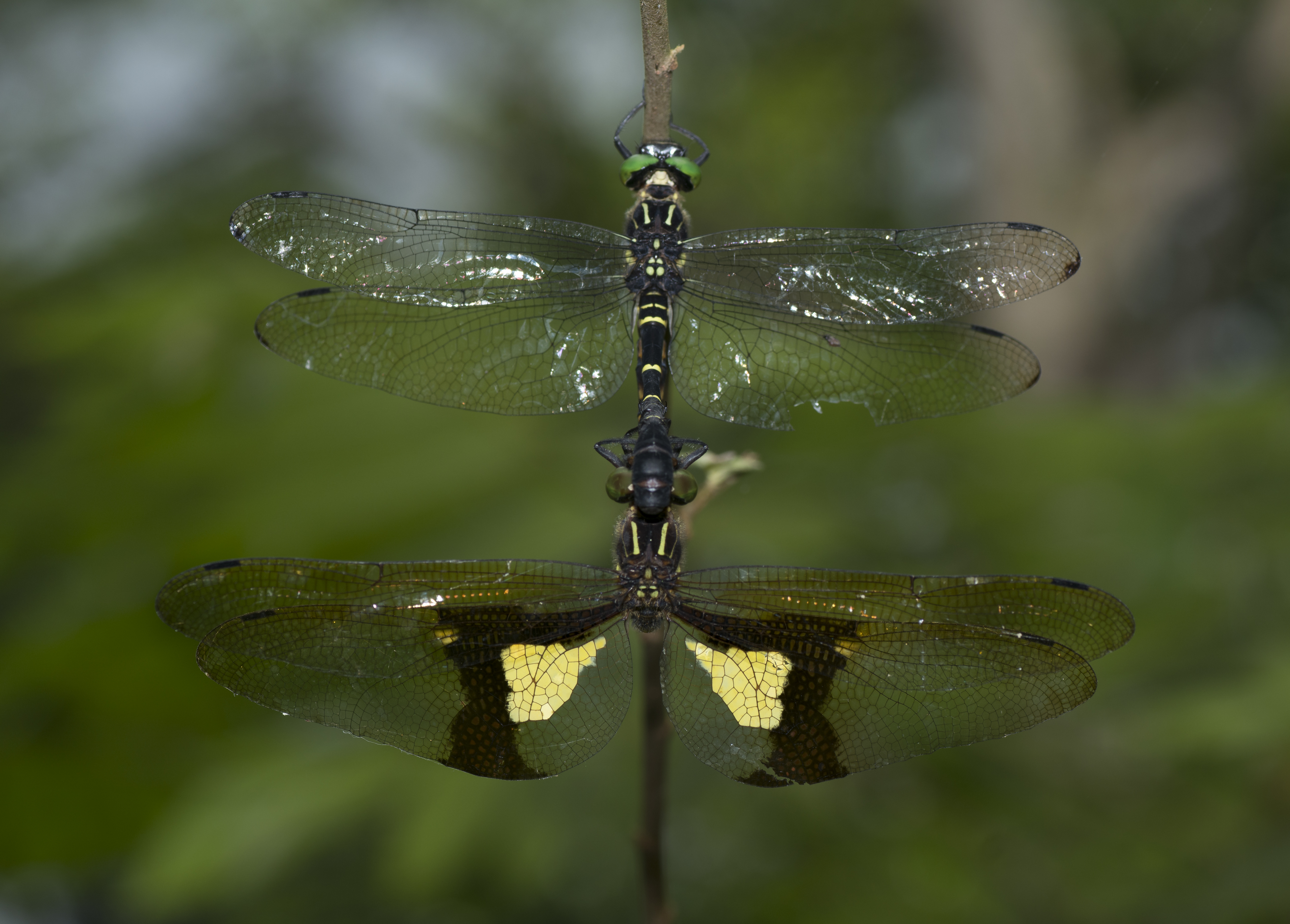
- Chlorogomphus magnificus (mating pair: male top, female bottom)
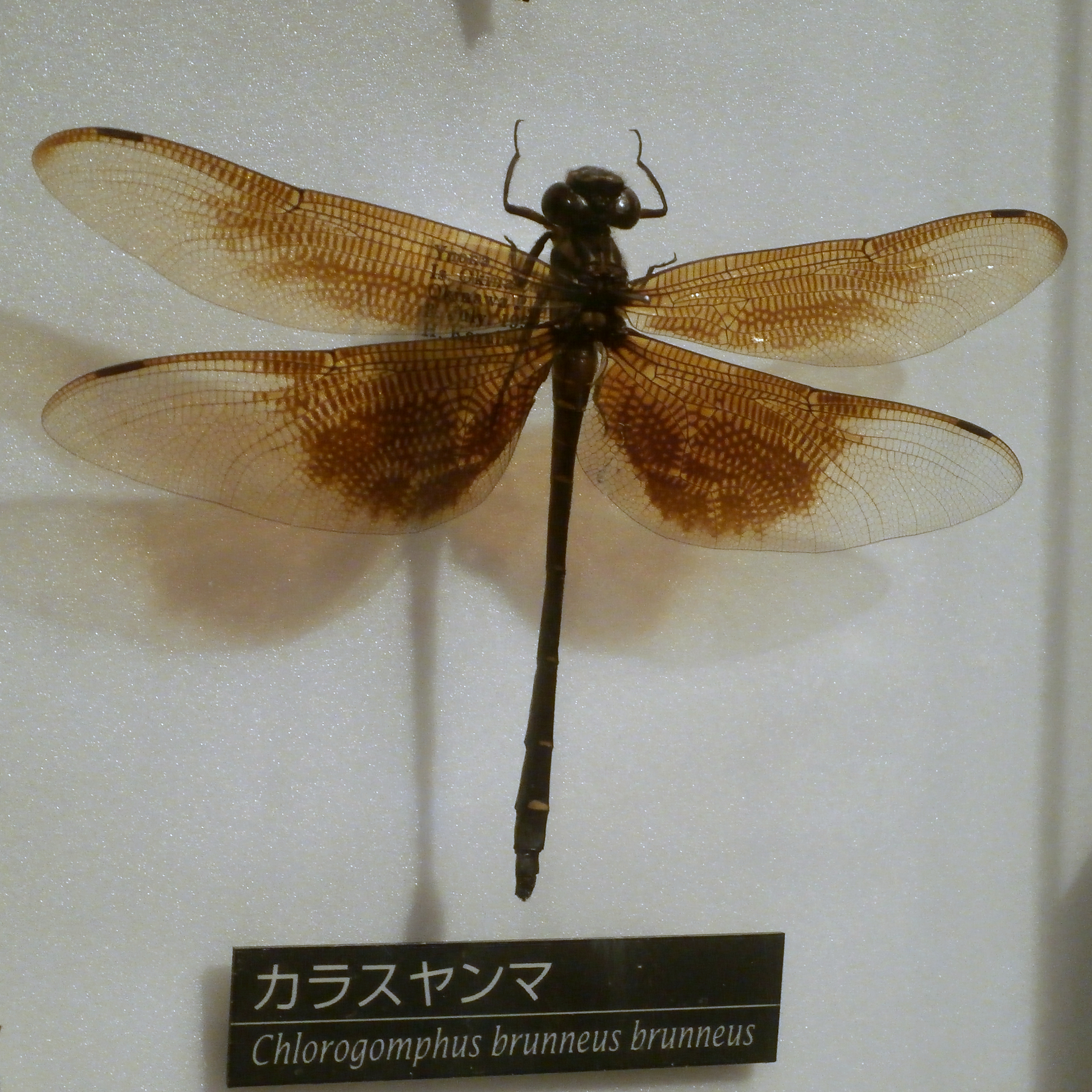
- Female of Chlorogomphus brunneus brunneus. Exhibit in the National Museum of Nature and Science, Tokyo, Japan.

Scientific classification
- Kingdom: Animalia
- Phylum: Arthropoda
- Clade: Pancrustacea
- Class: Insecta
- Order: Odonata
- Suborder: Anisoptera
- Superfamily: Cordulegastroidea
- Family: Chlorogomphidae; Needham, 1903
- Genus: Chlorogomphus; Selys, 1854
- Distribution of Chlorogomphus

= Chlorogomphus =

Genus of dragonflies

Chlorogomphus is a genus of large to very large dragonflies native to Asia and the only living genus in the family Chlorogomphidae. The genus comprises about 50 described species distributed from the Himalayas and southern China to Japan, Southeast Asia and parts of Indonesia, where they inhabit forested mountain streams.

Chlorogomphus includes some of the largest living dragonflies. Many species exhibit marked sexual dimorphism, with females having broad, often brightly coloured wings, while the wings of males are usually transparent. Females also lack the long external ovipositor characteristic of the closely related spiketails (Cordulegastridae), instead possessing a short or obsolete ovipositor.

== Description ==
Chlorogomphus includes some of the largest living dragonflies, with several species exceeding 100 mm in body length and females of Chlorogomphus papilio attaining a wingspan of about 145 mm. Adults are robust dragonflies, typically black or dark brown with contrasting yellow markings.

Many species exhibit pronounced sexual dimorphism. Males usually have transparent wings, whereas females often have broader hindwings with conspicuous yellow and brown markings.

Unlike the closely related spiketails (Cordulegastridae), females lack the prominent external ovipositor characteristic of that family, instead possessing a short or obsolete vulvar scale.

== Distribution and habitat ==
Species of Chlorogomphus are distributed across Asia, from the Himalayas and the Indian subcontinent through southern China, Taiwan and Japan to Indochina, the Malay Peninsula and parts of Indonesia.

They inhabit forested mountain regions, where the larvae develop in clear, fast-flowing streams and rivers with rocky or gravelly beds. Most species occur at moderate to high elevations, although some are found in lower montane forests.

== Behaviour ==
Adults are powerful fliers but are often difficult to observe, spending much of their time high above the forest canopy. Males patrol along forest tracks and streams, while mating has been observed away from water.

== Taxonomic history ==
Chlorogomphus was established by Selys in 1854 for a distinctive group of large Asian dragonflies, with Chlorogomphus magnificus from Sumatra designated as the type species. He later described the genus Orogomphus for several related species, but Martin (1906) concluded that the characters separating the two genera formed a continuum and united them within Chlorogomphus.

The marked sexual dimorphism of the genus complicated its early taxonomy. Selys initially questioned whether Chlorogomphus hyalinus might represent the male of Chlorogomphus magnificus, but later treated them as separate species. Martin argued that the discovery of additional species showed the differences to be sexual rather than specific, and this interpretation was later adopted by subsequent catalogues, which treat Chlorogomphus hyalinus as a junior synonym of Chlorogomphus magnificus.

Needham (1903) recognised the group as the subfamily Chlorogomphinae within a broadly defined Aeshnidae. Tillyard (1917) expanded the diagnosis of the subfamily, and Fraser (1957) emphasised the obsolete female ovipositor as one of its defining characters.

Modern molecular studies recognise Chlorogomphus as the sole genus of the family Chlorogomphidae, one of the three families comprising the superfamily Cordulegastroidea.

== Etymology ==
The genus name Chlorogomphus is derived from the Greek χλωρός (chlōrós, "green") and γομφός (gomphós, "bolt", "peg" or "wedge"). The suffix "-gomphus" had become an established generic ending for dragonflies with characteristics of the dragonfly genus Gomphus. Sélys did not explain the reason for choosing the name.

== Species ==
The following species are currently placed in Chlorogomphus:

- Chlorogomphus albomarginatus Karube, 1995
- Chlorogomphus aritai Karube, 2013
- Chlorogomphus arooni Asahina, 1981
- Chlorogomphus atkinsoni (Selys, 1878)
- Chlorogomphus auratus Martin, 1910
- Chlorogomphus auripennis Zhang & Cai, 2014
- Chlorogomphus brevistigma Oguma, 1926
- Chlorogomphus brunneus Oguma, 1926
- Chlorogomphus caloptera Karube, 2013
- Chlorogomphus campioni (Fraser, 1924)
- Chlorogomphus canhvang Kompier & Karube, 2018
- Chlorogomphus danhkyi Phan, Karube, Hung & Anh, 2021
- Chlorogomphus daviesi Karube, 2001
- Chlorogomphus dyak (Laidlaw, 1911)
- Chlorogomphus fraseri St. Quentin, 1936
- Chlorogomphus gracilis Wilson & Reels, 2001
- Chlorogomphus hiten (Sasamoto, Yokoi & Teramoto, 2011)
- Chlorogomphus hoaian Phan & Karube, 2022
- Chlorogomphus infuscatus Needham, 1930
- Chlorogomphus iriomotensis Ishida, 1972
- Chlorogomphus kimminsi Fraser, 1940
- Chlorogomphus kitawakii Karube, 1995
- Chlorogomphus magnificus Selys, 1854
- Chlorogomphus manau Dow & Ngiam, 2011
- Chlorogomphus miyashitai Karube, 1995
- Chlorogomphus mortoni Fraser, 1936
- Chlorogomphus nakamurai Karube, 1995
- Chlorogomphus nasutus Needham, 1930
- Chlorogomphus ojisan (Karube, 2013)
- Chlorogomphus okinawensis Ishida, 1964
- Chlorogomphus owadai Asahina, 1995
- Chlorogomphus papilio Ris, 1927
- Chlorogomphus piaoacensis Karube, 2013
- Chlorogomphus preciosus (Fraser, 1924)
- Chlorogomphus risi Chen, 1950
- Chlorogomphus sachiyoae Karube, 1995
- Chlorogomphus satoi Asahina, 1995
- Chlorogomphus schmidti Asahina, 1986
- Chlorogomphus selysi Fraser, 1929
- Chlorogomphus serratus Karube, Katatani & Phan, 2024
- Chlorogomphus shanicus Wilson, 2002
- Chlorogomphus soarer (Wilson, 2002)
- Chlorogomphus speciosus (Selys, 1891)
- Chlorogomphus splendidus (Selys, 1878)
- Chlorogomphus suzukii (Oguma, 1926)
- Chlorogomphus takakuwai Karube, 1995
- Chlorogomphus uenoi Asahina, 1995
- Chlorogomphus usignatus (Chao, 1999)
- Chlorogomphus usudai Ishida, 1996
- Chlorogomphus vani Phan & Karube, 2022
- Chlorogomphus vietnamensis Asahina, 1969
- Chlorogomphus xanthoptera (Fraser, 1919)
- Chlorogomphus yokoii Karube, 1995
- Chlorogomphus yoshihiroi Karube, 1994
