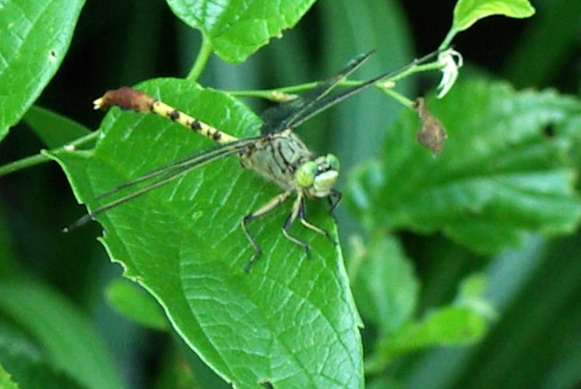
- Jade Clubtail

Scientific classification
- Kingdom: Animalia
- Phylum: Arthropoda
- Class: Insecta
- Order: Odonata
- Infraorder: Anisoptera
- Family: Gomphidae
- Genus: Arigomphus; Needham, 1897

= Arigomphus =

Pond clubtails

Genus of dragonflies

Arigomphus is a genus of dragonflies of the Gomphidae family. This group is commonly called the pond clubtails. The species are fairly plain and only the males have the club-shaped abdomen. Unlike other gomphids, they may emerge from artificial ponds.

The genus is confined to North America. It contains the following species:

- Arigomphus cornutus (Tough, 1900) – horned clubtail
- Arigomphus furcifer (Hagen in Selys, 1878) – lilypad clubtail
- Arigomphus lentulus (Needham, 1902) – stillwater clubtail
- Arigomphus maxwelli (Ferguson, 1950) – bayou clubtail
- Arigomphus pallidus (Rambur, 1842) – gray-green clubtail
- Arigomphus submedianus (Williamson, 1914) – jade clubtail
- Arigomphus villosipes (Selys, 1854) – unicorn clubtail
