= Dolania =

Conservation status
- Apparently Secure (NatureServe)

Scientific classification
- Kingdom: Animalia
- Phylum: Arthropoda
- Clade: Pancrustacea
- Class: Insecta
- Order: Ephemeroptera
- Family: Behningiidae
- Genus: Dolania; Edmunds & Traver, 1959
- Species: D. americana

Binomial name
- Dolania americana Edmunds & Traver, 1959

Genus of mayflies

Dolania is a monotypic genus of mayfly in the family Behningiidae containing the single species Dolania americana, also known as the American sand-burrowing mayfly. It is found in the southeastern United States, as far south as Florida, and is generally uncommon. The adult insects emerge before dawn in early summer, mate and die within the space of about thirty minutes. The female deposits her eggs in the water and dies within five minutes of emergence. This is believed to be the shortest adult lifespan of any insect.

== Description ==
The adult Dolania americana has a pale brownish-purple body and membranous wings that are 10 to 13 mm (0.4 to 0.5 in) in length. The legs of both male and females are vestigial, thin and twisted, but appear to retain some function. The cerci are longer and more robust than the terminal filaments. The penis of the male is twice as long as the genital forceps.

The body of the nymph is cylindrical with a flattened head. The antennae are on the ventral side of the head and the small mandibles do not bear any tusks. The sides of the head and the prothorax are spiny. None of the legs have claws; the front pair are palp-like and the remaining pairs are spiny and protect the gills, which are on the ventral surface of the abdomen. The abdomen is densely covered with bristles. The first abdominal segment has a pair of single gills and the other segments bear further pairs of rather smaller, bifid gills. There are three tail filaments at the tip of the abdomen.

== Distribution and habitat ==
Dolania americana is found in the streams and rivers of the coastal plains of the southeastern United States. The nymph burrows into the sandy riverbed and the adults appear briefly flying over the water surface.

== Biology ==
In Florida, the adults emerge at the end of April or in early May, and in South Carolina, in the first half of June. When ready to transform, the nymphs swim to the surface, split their skin, transform into the subimago winged form, and fly off, all in the course of ten to twenty seconds. The exuviae (nymphal skin) float away downstream. Their emergence is synchronised and the males emerge first, about one and a half hours before sunrise. Male subimagos moult but the females, which emerge soon after the males, remain in the subimago form.

Having moulted into the adult form within about five minutes of emergence, the males patrol a stretch of river about 15 to 20 metres (49 to 66 ft) long, seeking out females with which to mate. They continue to do this until they drown, having fallen into the water from exhaustion. Upon emergence, the females mate, deposit their eggs into the water and die within the course of about five minutes. All the mayflies die within about thirty minutes of emergence.

The eggs are about 1 mm (0.04 in) in diameter, among the largest of eggs laid by mayflies. The nymphs that hatch out of these burrow into the sediment on the bed of the river using their forelegs and head. Their usual habitat is fairly clean sand in an area with rapidly moving water. They feed on the larvae of chironomids and ceratopogonids. By autumn, they are about one third grown and complete their development within a year.
