= William Peters =

William, Willie, Willy, or Bill Peters may refer to:

== Arts and entertainment ==
- William Peters (painter) (1742–1814), British painter
- William Theodore Peters (1862–1904), American poet and actor
- William Wesley Peters (1912–1991), American architect
- Willy Peters (1915–1976), Swedish actor and director
- William Peters (journalist) (1921–2007), American journalist and documentary filmmaker
- William Peter McGivern (a.k.a. Bill Peters, 1918–1982), American novelist and television scriptwriter

== Law and politics ==
- William Peters (lawyer) (1702–1786), American lawyer and judge in colonial Philadelphia
- William Thompson Peters (1805–1885), American politician from Connecticut
- William H. Peters (1825–?), American politician in Wisconsin
- William Peters (Australian politician) (1903–1978), member of the New South Wales Legislative Council
- William Peters (diplomat) (1923–2014), British diplomat and founder of Jubilee 2000
- William Peters (mayor) (fl. 1963–1965), South African politician; mayor of Cape Town

== Sports ==
- W. S. Peters (William Stitt Peters, 1867–1933), American baseball player
- Bill Peters (footballer) (1898–1957), Australian footballer
- William Peters (sport shooter) (William Pietersz, 1925–1992), Colombian Olympic shooter
- Bill Peters (ice hockey) (born 1965), Canadian ice hockey player and coach
- Willie Peters (born 1979), Australian rugby league player and coach

== Others ==
- William John Peters (1863–1942), American explorer and scientist
- William L. Peters (1939–2000), American entomologist
