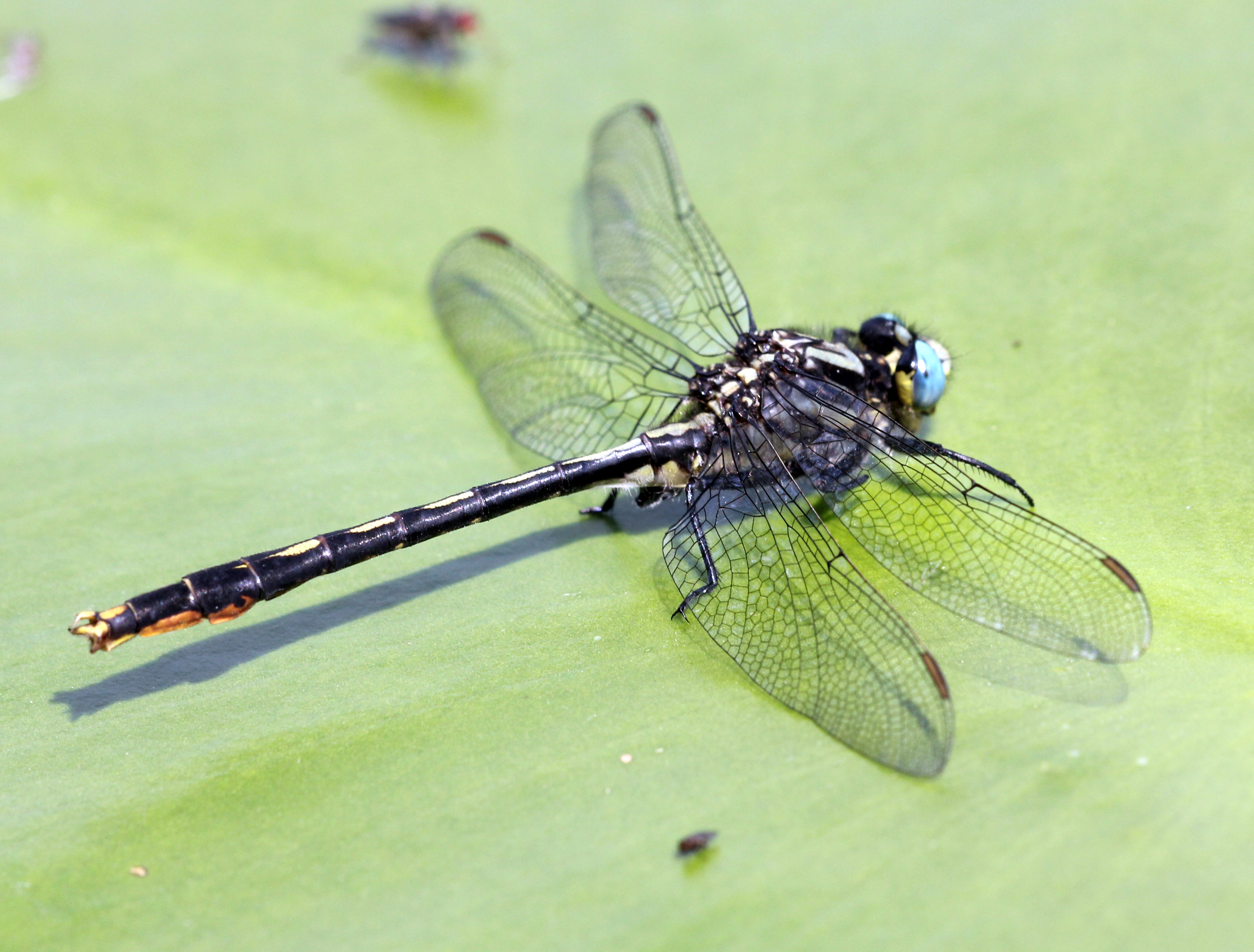

Conservation status
- Least Concern (IUCN 3.1)

Scientific classification
- Kingdom: Animalia
- Phylum: Arthropoda
- Class: Insecta
- Order: Odonata
- Infraorder: Anisoptera
- Family: Gomphidae
- Genus: Arigomphus
- Species: A. furcifer

Binomial name
- Arigomphus furcifer (Hagen in Selys, 1878)

Synonyms
- Gomphus furcifer Hagen in Selys, 1878

= Arigomphus furcifer =

Species of dragonfly

Arigomphus furcifer, the lilypad clubtail, is a species of clubtail in the family of dragonflies known as Gomphidae. It is found in North America.

The IUCN conservation status of Arigomphus furcifer is "LC", least concern, with no immediate threat to the species' survival. The population is stable.
