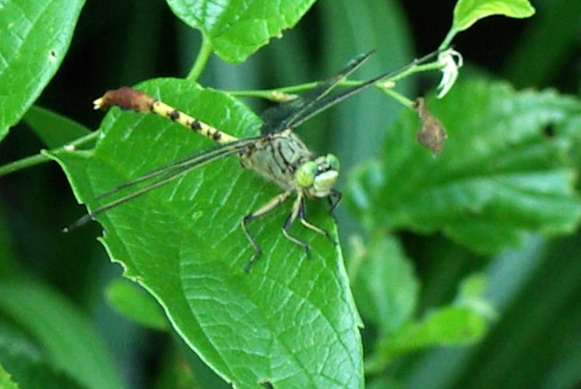

Scientific classification
- Kingdom: Animalia
- Phylum: Arthropoda
- Class: Insecta
- Order: Odonata
- Infraorder: Anisoptera
- Family: Gomphidae
- Genus: Arigomphus
- Species: A. submedianus

Binomial name
- Arigomphus submedianus (Williamson, 1914)
- Range of A. submedianus

= Jade clubtail =

Species of dragonfly

The jade clubtail (Arigomphus submedianus) is a dragonfly in the family Gomphidae. Its total length is 51 to 55 mm (2.0 to 2.2 in). The jade clubtail species typically are around for the spring and summer season, from April to July. Their habitat consists of ponds, lakes, muddy environments and canals which often may help with adjusting their body temperature.
