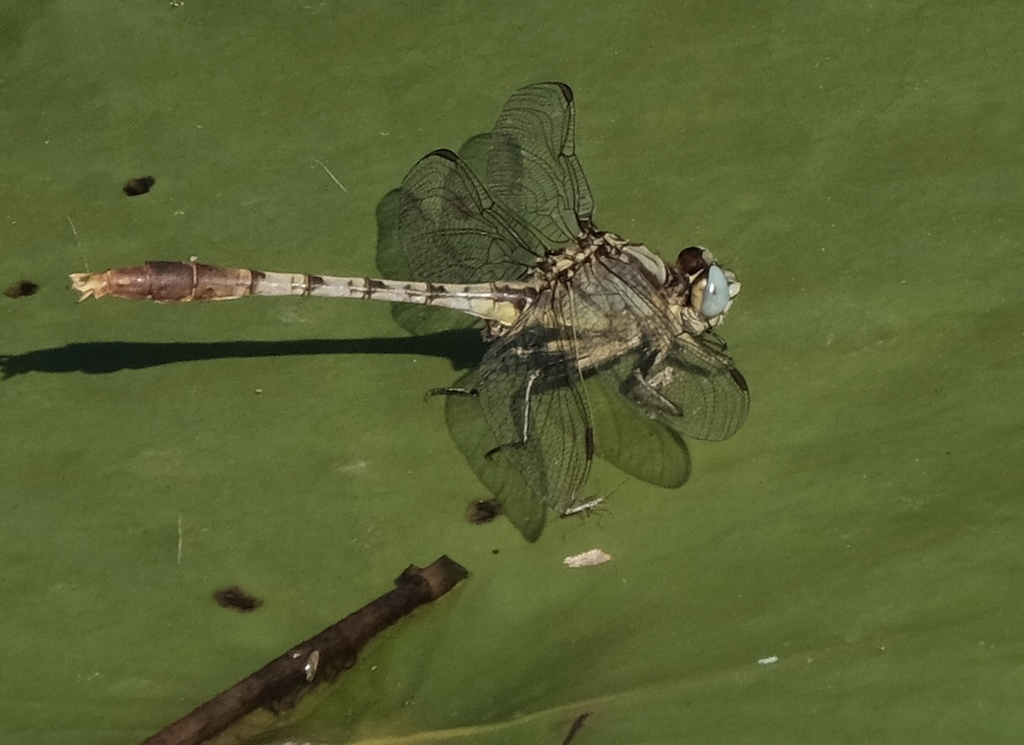

Conservation status
- Least Concern (IUCN 3.1)

Scientific classification
- Kingdom: Animalia
- Phylum: Arthropoda
- Class: Insecta
- Order: Odonata
- Infraorder: Anisoptera
- Family: Gomphidae
- Genus: Arigomphus
- Species: A. lentulus

Binomial name
- Arigomphus lentulus (Needham, 1902)

Synonyms
- Gomphus lentulus Needham, 1902

= Arigomphus lentulus =

Species of dragonfly

Arigomphus lentulus, the stillwater clubtail, is a species of clubtail in the family of dragonflies known as Gomphidae. It is found in North America. This dragonfly species can breed in calm waters. Like many dragonflies, this species feeds on small flying insects.

The IUCN conservation status of Arigomphus lentulus is "LC", least concern, with no immediate threat to the species' survival. The population is stable.
