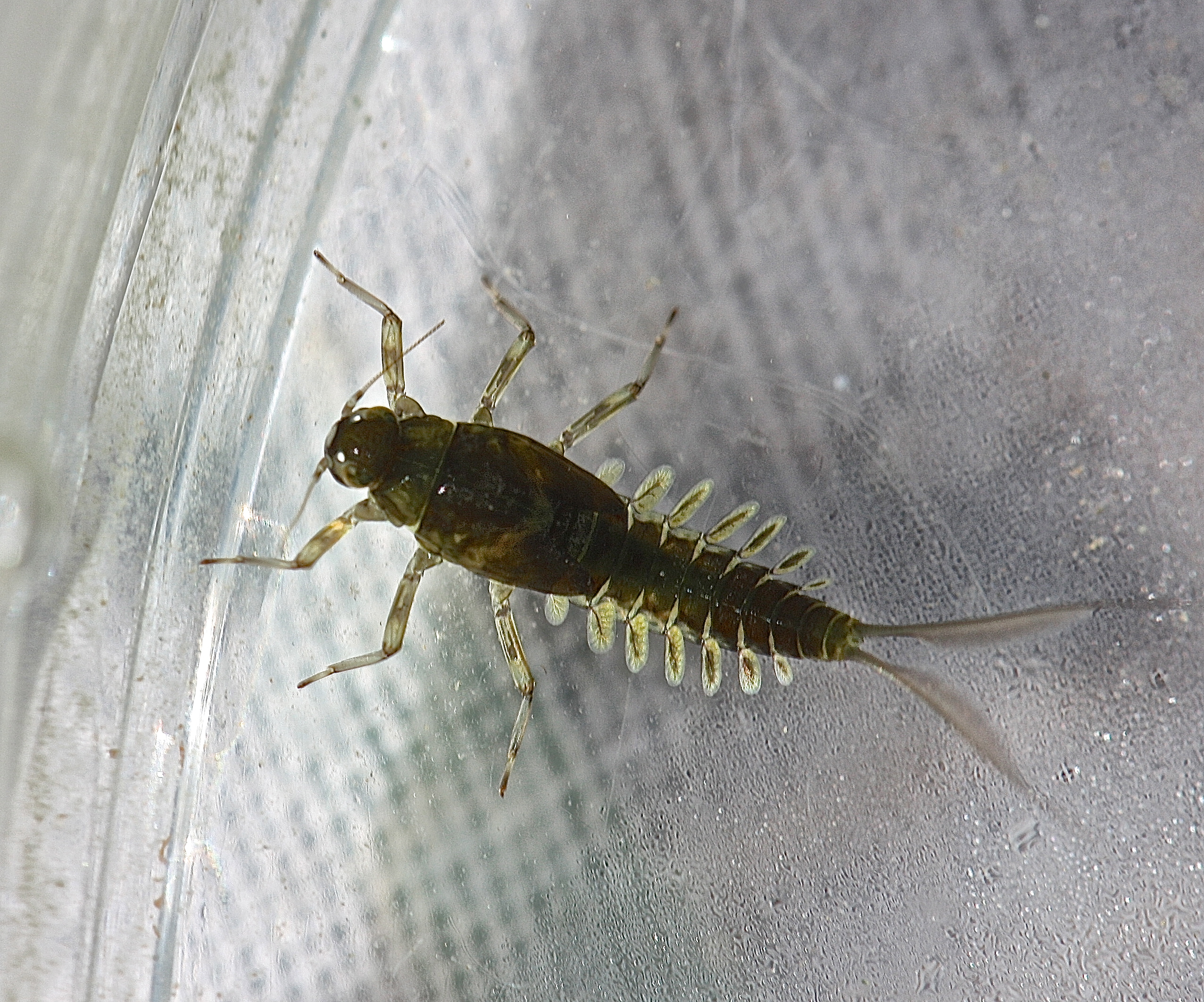

Scientific classification
- Domain: Eukaryota
- Kingdom: Animalia
- Phylum: Arthropoda
- Class: Insecta
- Order: Ephemeroptera
- Family: Baetidae
- Genus: Heterocloeon
- Species: H. curiosum

Binomial name
- Heterocloeon curiosum (McDunnough, 1923)

Synonyms
- Centroptilum curiosum McDunnough, 1923; Rheobaetis traverae Müller-Liebenau, 1974

= Heterocloeon curiosum =

Species of mayfly

Heterocloeon curiosum is a species of small minnow mayfly in the family Baetidae. It is found in North America.
