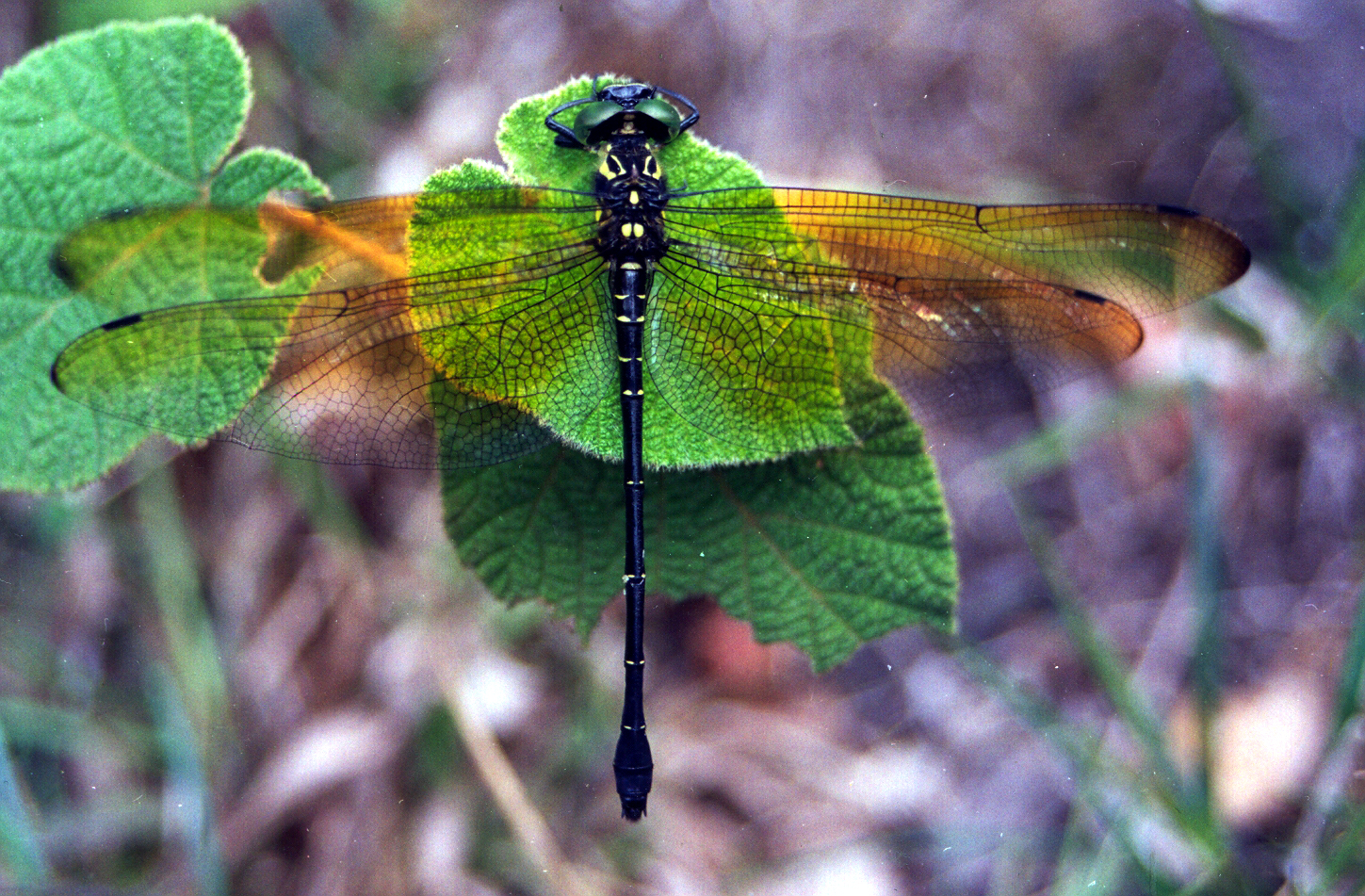
- From Pakshipathalam, Brahmagiri, Wayanad

Conservation status
- Least Concern (IUCN 3.1)

Scientific classification
- Kingdom: Animalia
- Phylum: Arthropoda
- Clade: Pancrustacea
- Class: Insecta
- Order: Odonata
- Infraorder: Anisoptera
- Family: Chlorogomphidae
- Genus: Chlorogomphus
- Species: C. campioni

Binomial name
- Chlorogomphus campioni (Fraser, 1924)

Synonyms
- Orogomphus campioni Fraser, 1924

= Chlorogomphus campioni =

Species of dragonfly

Chlorogomphus campioni, the Nilgiri mountain hawk, is a species of dragonfly in the family Chlorogomphidae. It is known only from the Western Ghats of India. The distribution of the species is restricted to South Canara and Kodagu in Karnataka, Malabar in Kerala and the Nilgris in Tamil Nadu.

== Description and habitat ==
It is a large dragonfly with its head rather broad from side to side and eyes are moderately separated with emerald green colour. Its thorax is black with three oblique bright yellow stripes. Its wings are transparent with dark brown apices and black pterostigma. Abdomen is black with yellow markings. The colour and markings of the female is very similar to the male.

It is commonly found in mountains in the Western Ghats, soaring in high altitudes.

The species is named after Herbert Campion.

== See also ==
- List of odonates of India
- List of odonata of Kerala
