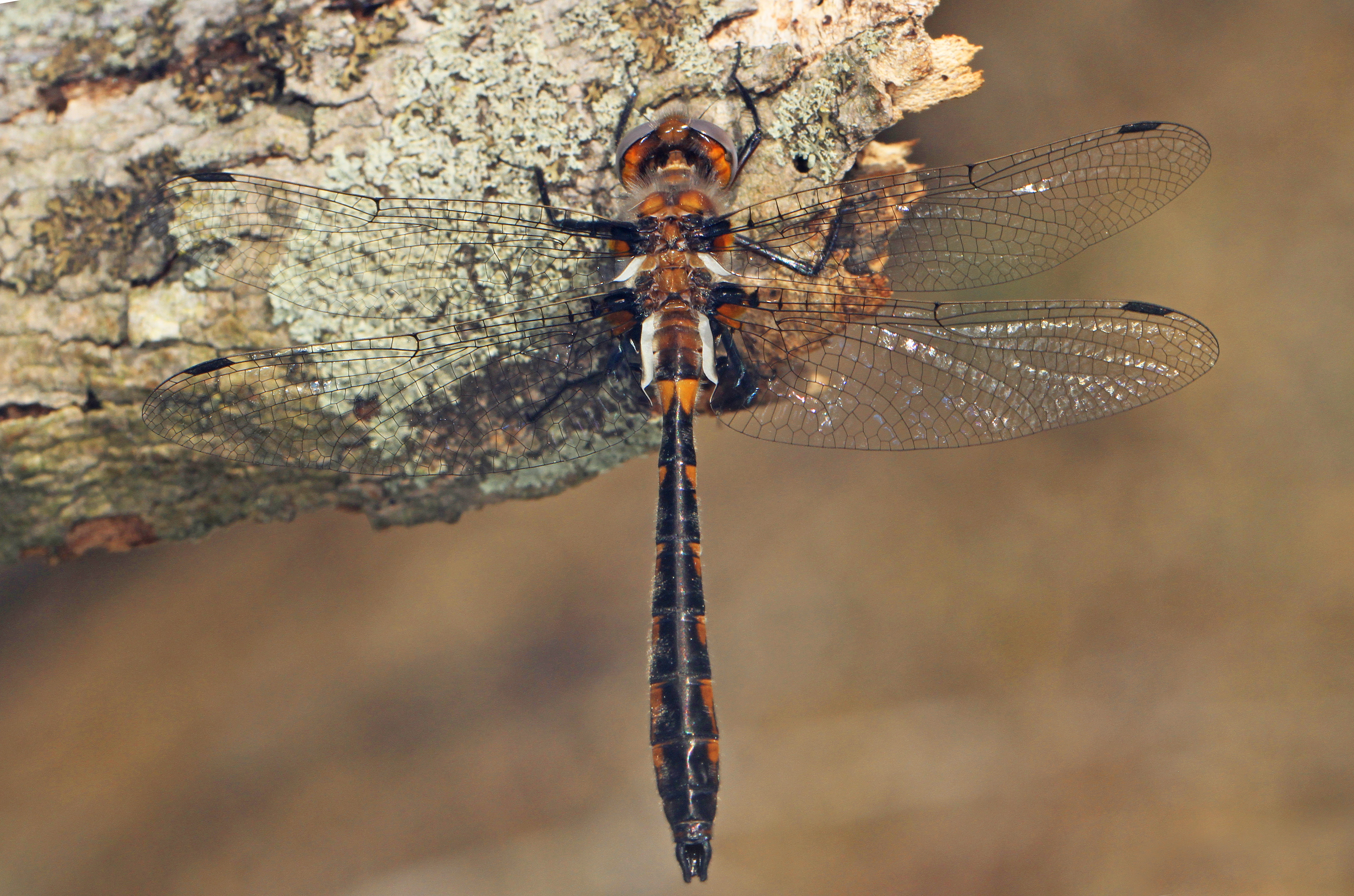

Conservation status
- Least Concern (IUCN 3.1)

Scientific classification
- Kingdom: Animalia
- Phylum: Arthropoda
- Class: Insecta
- Order: Odonata
- Infraorder: Anisoptera
- Family: Corduliidae
- Genus: Helocordulia
- Species: H. uhleri

Binomial name
- Helocordulia uhleri (Selys, 1871)

= Helocordulia uhleri =

Species of dragonfly

Helocordulia uhleri, or Uhler's sundragon, is a species of emerald dragonfly in the family Corduliidae. It is found in North America.

The IUCN conservation status of Helocordulia uhleri is "LC", least concern, with no immediate threat to the survival of the species. The population is stable.

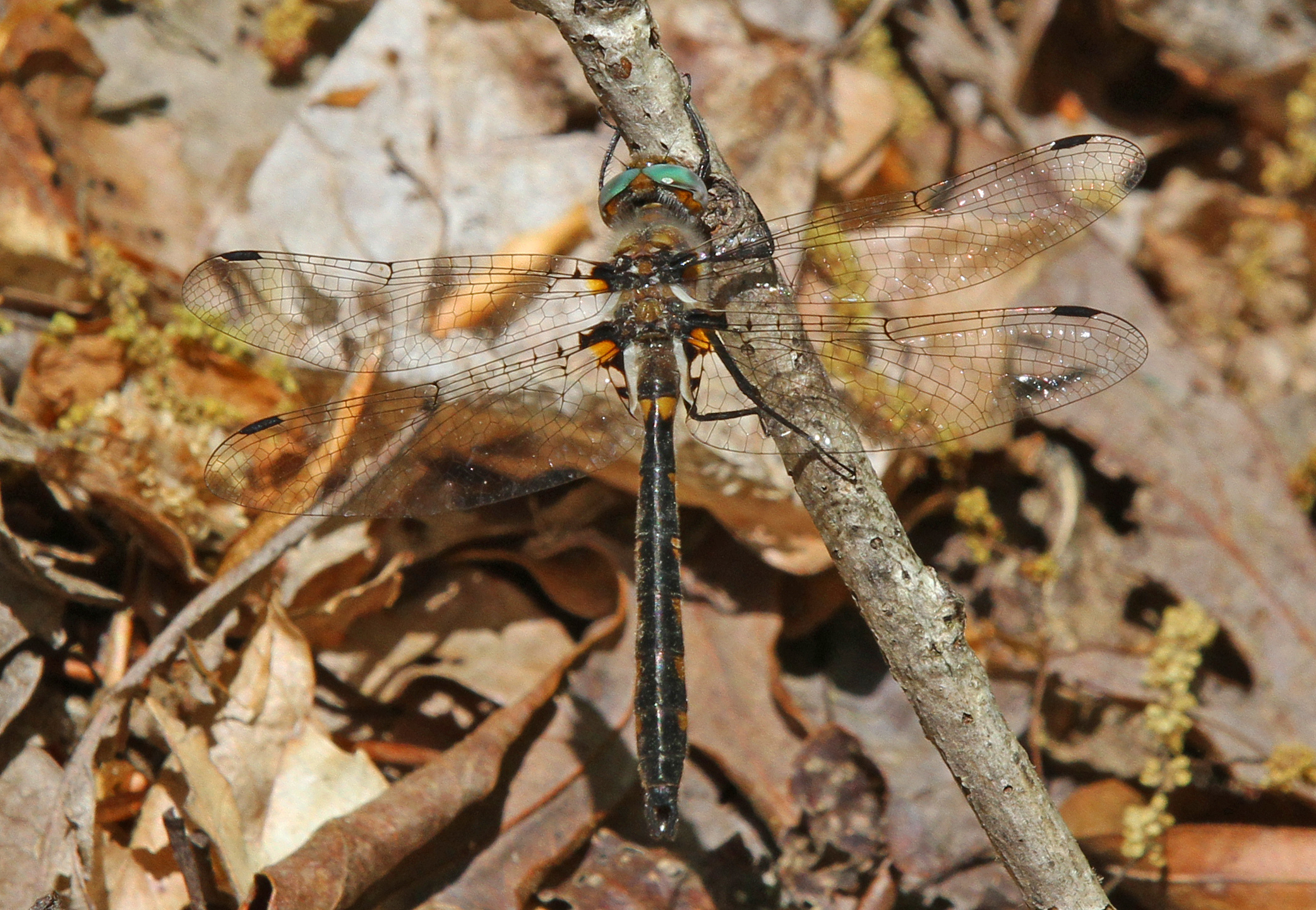
Uhler's sundragon, Helocordulia uhleri
