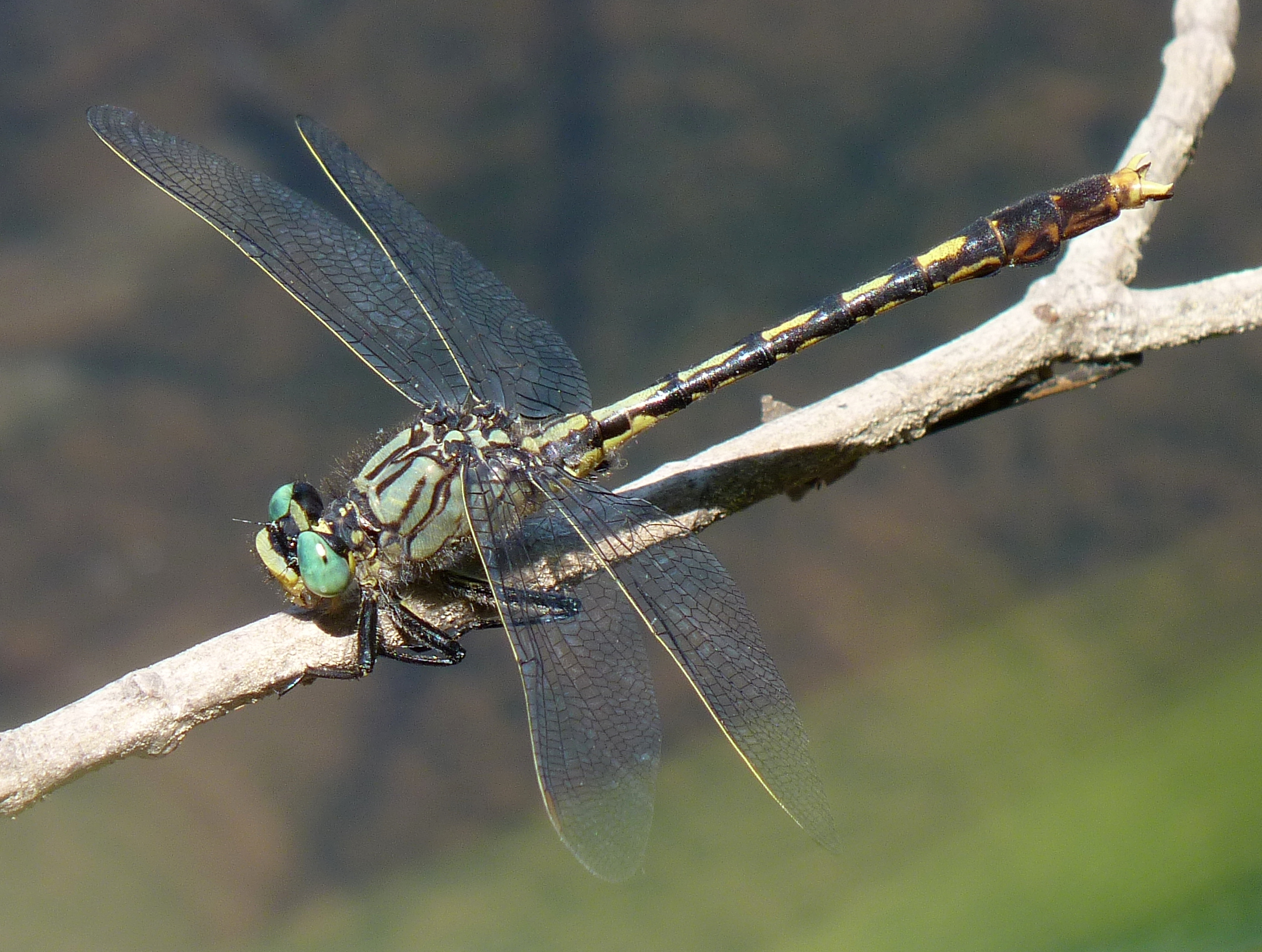

Conservation status
- Least Concern (IUCN 3.1)

Scientific classification
- Kingdom: Animalia
- Phylum: Arthropoda
- Class: Insecta
- Order: Odonata
- Infraorder: Anisoptera
- Family: Gomphidae
- Genus: Arigomphus
- Species: A. villosipes

Binomial name
- Arigomphus villosipes (Selys, 1854)

Synonyms
- Gomphus villosipes Selys, 1854

= Arigomphus villosipes =

Species of dragonfly

Arigomphus villosipes, the unicorn clubtail, is a species of clubtail in the dragonfly family Gomphidae. It is found in North America.

The IUCN conservation status of Arigomphus villosipes is "LC", least concern, with no immediate threat to the species' survival. The population is stable. The IUCN status was reviewed in 2017.

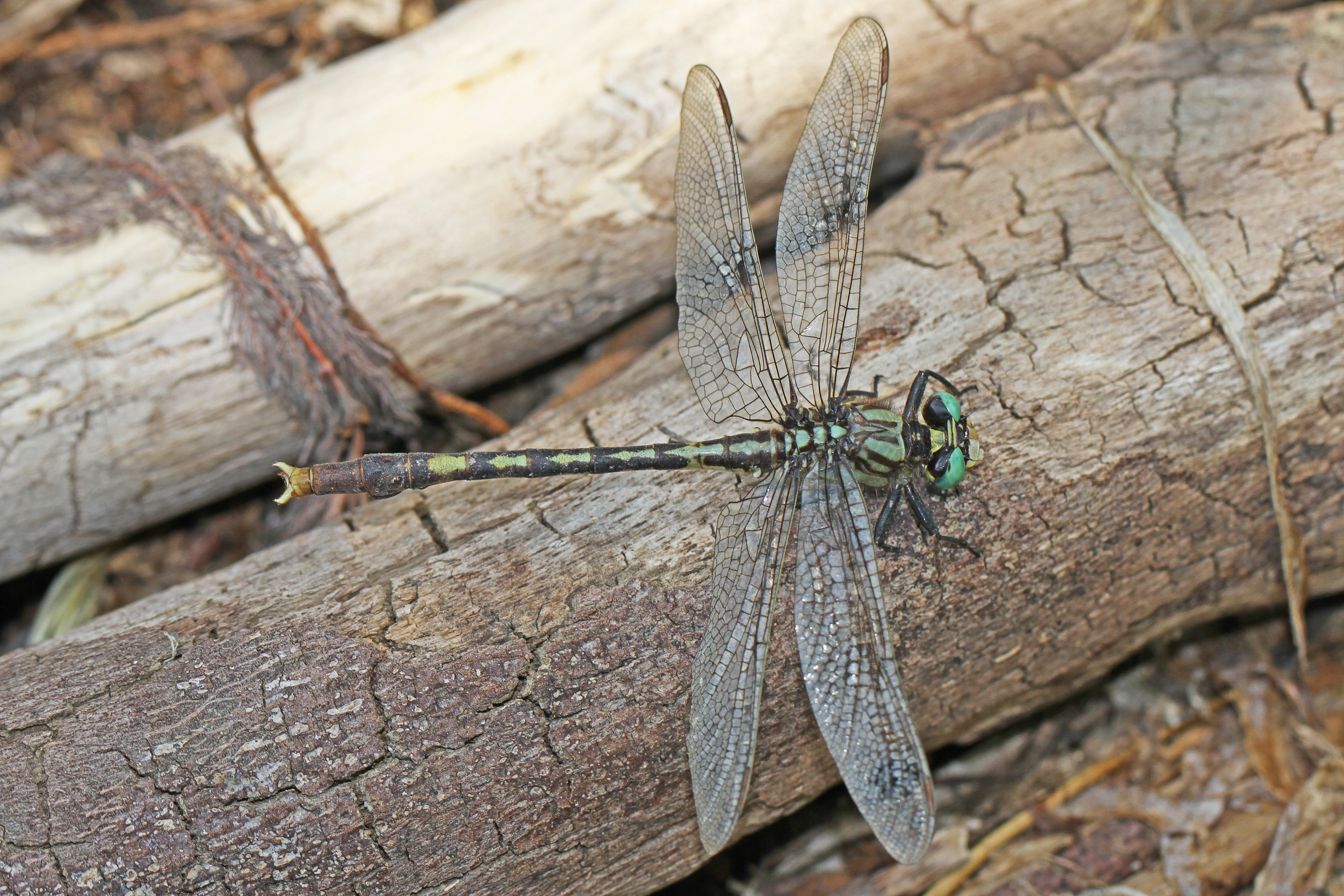
Leesylvania State Park, Woodbridge, Virginia

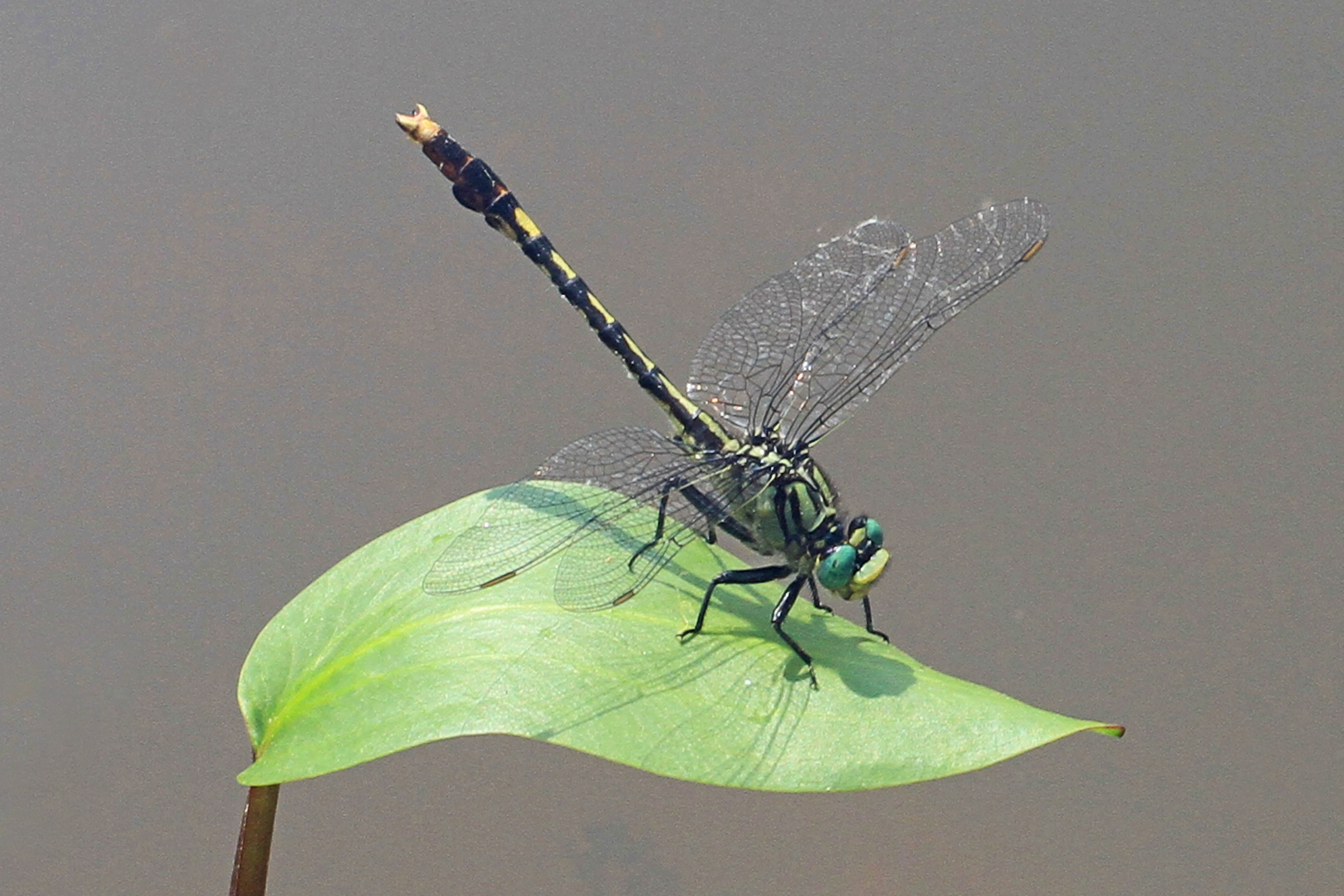
Mason Neck West, Mason Neck, Virginia

Media related to Arigomphus villosipes at Wikimedia Commons
