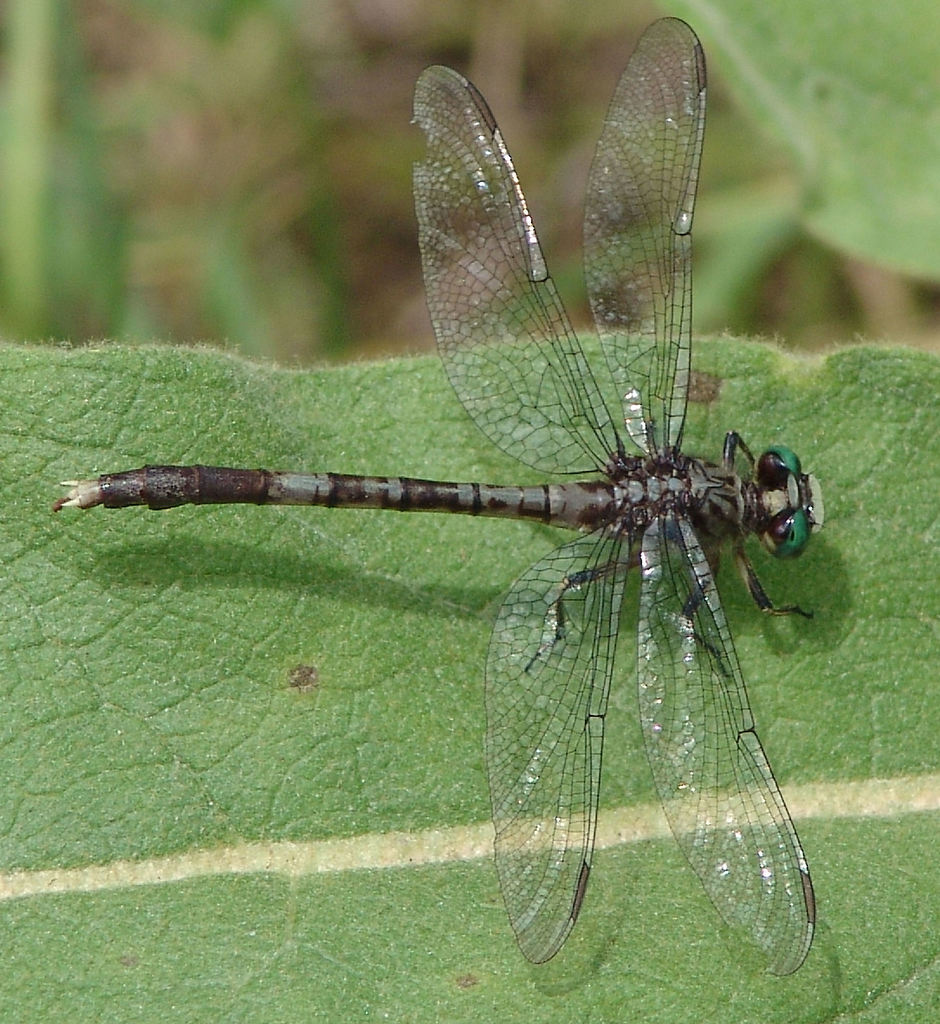

Conservation status
- Least Concern (IUCN 3.1)

Scientific classification
- Domain: Eukaryota
- Kingdom: Animalia
- Phylum: Arthropoda
- Class: Insecta
- Order: Odonata
- Infraorder: Anisoptera
- Family: Gomphidae
- Genus: Arigomphus
- Species: A. maxwelli

Binomial name
- Arigomphus maxwelli (Ferguson, 1950)

= Arigomphus maxwelli =

Species of dragonfly

Arigomphus maxwelli is a dragonfly in the genus Arigomphus ("pond clubtails"), in the family Gomphidae ("clubtails"). A common name for Arigomphus maxwelli is "bayou clubtail". Arigomphus maxwelli is found in North America.

The IUCN conservation status of Arigomphus maxwelli is "LC", least concern, with no immediate threat to the species' survival. The population is stable.
