= Chlorogomphus iriomotensis =

Conservation status
- Least Concern (IUCN 3.1)

Scientific classification
- Kingdom: Animalia
- Phylum: Arthropoda
- Clade: Pancrustacea
- Class: Insecta
- Order: Odonata
- Infraorder: Anisoptera
- Family: Chlorogomphidae
- Genus: Chlorogomphus
- Species: C. iriomotensis

Binomial name
- Chlorogomphus iriomotensis Ishida, 1972

Species of dragonfly

Chlorogomphus iriomotensis is a species of dragonfly in the family Chlorogomphidae. It is endemic to Japan.
