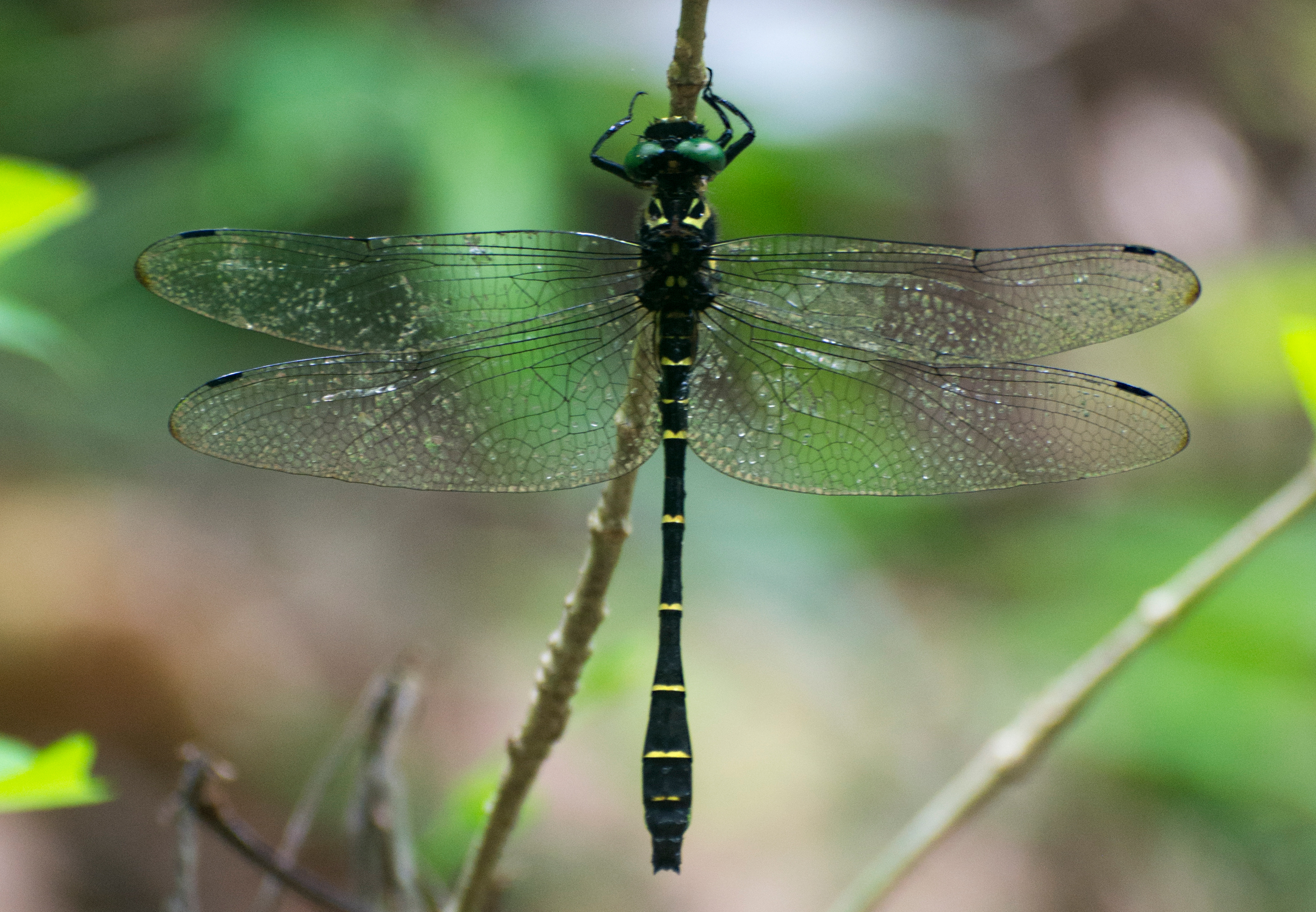
- Male

Conservation status
- Vulnerable (IUCN 3.1)

Scientific classification
- Kingdom: Animalia
- Phylum: Arthropoda
- Clade: Pancrustacea
- Class: Insecta
- Order: Odonata
- Infraorder: Anisoptera
- Family: Chlorogomphidae
- Genus: Chlorogomphus
- Species: C. xanthoptera

Binomial name
- Chlorogomphus xanthoptera (Fraser, 1919)

Synonyms
- Orogomphus xanthoptera Fraser, 1919

= Chlorogomphus xanthoptera =

Species of dragonfly

Chlorogomphus xanthoptera is a species of dragonfly in the family Chlorogomphidae. It is known only from the Western Ghats of India, to the south of Palakkad Gap, including Anamalai Hills, Tirunelveli Hills, Munnar and south of Travancore.

== Description and habitat ==
It is a large dragonfly with dark-brown head and bottle-green eyes. Its thorax is black with grass green stripes. Its wings are transparent with dark brown apices and black pterostigma. Abdomen is black with greenish yellow markings. The colour and markings of the female is very similar to the male.

It is commonly found in mountains in the Western Ghats, south of Palakkad Gap, soaring in high altitudes.

== See also ==
- List of odonates of India
- List of odonata of Kerala
