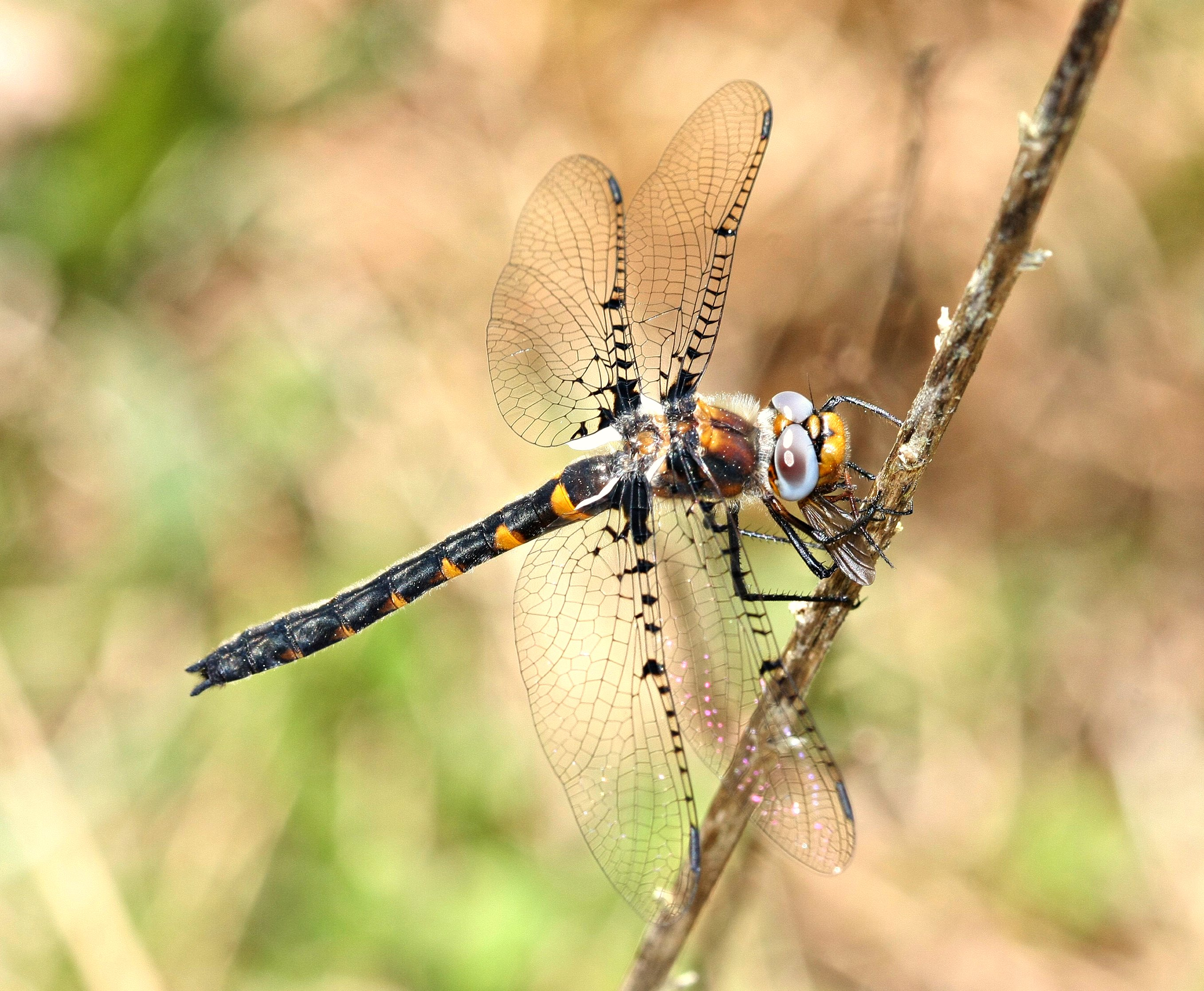

Conservation status
- Least Concern (IUCN 3.1)

Scientific classification
- Kingdom: Animalia
- Phylum: Arthropoda
- Class: Insecta
- Order: Odonata
- Infraorder: Anisoptera
- Family: Corduliidae
- Genus: Helocordulia
- Species: H. selysii

Binomial name
- Helocordulia selysii (Hagen in Selys, 1878)

= Helocordulia selysii =

Species of dragonfly

Helocordulia selysii, the Selys' sundragon, is a species of emerald dragonfly in the family Corduliidae. It is found in North America.

The IUCN conservation status of Helocordulia selysii is "LC", least concern, with no immediate threat to the species' survival. The population is stable. The IUCN status was reviewed in 2017.

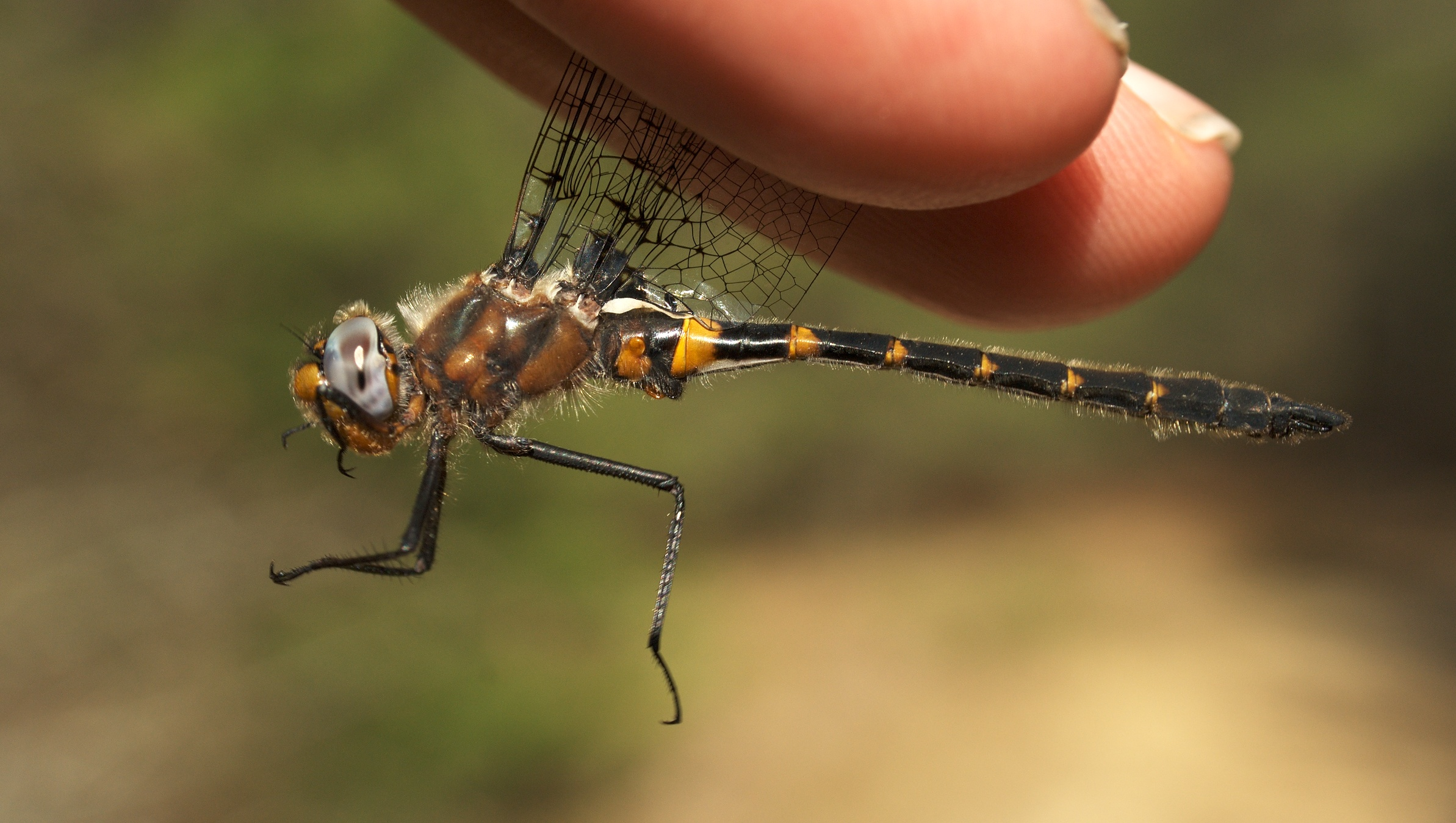
Selys' sundragon, Helocordulia selysii
