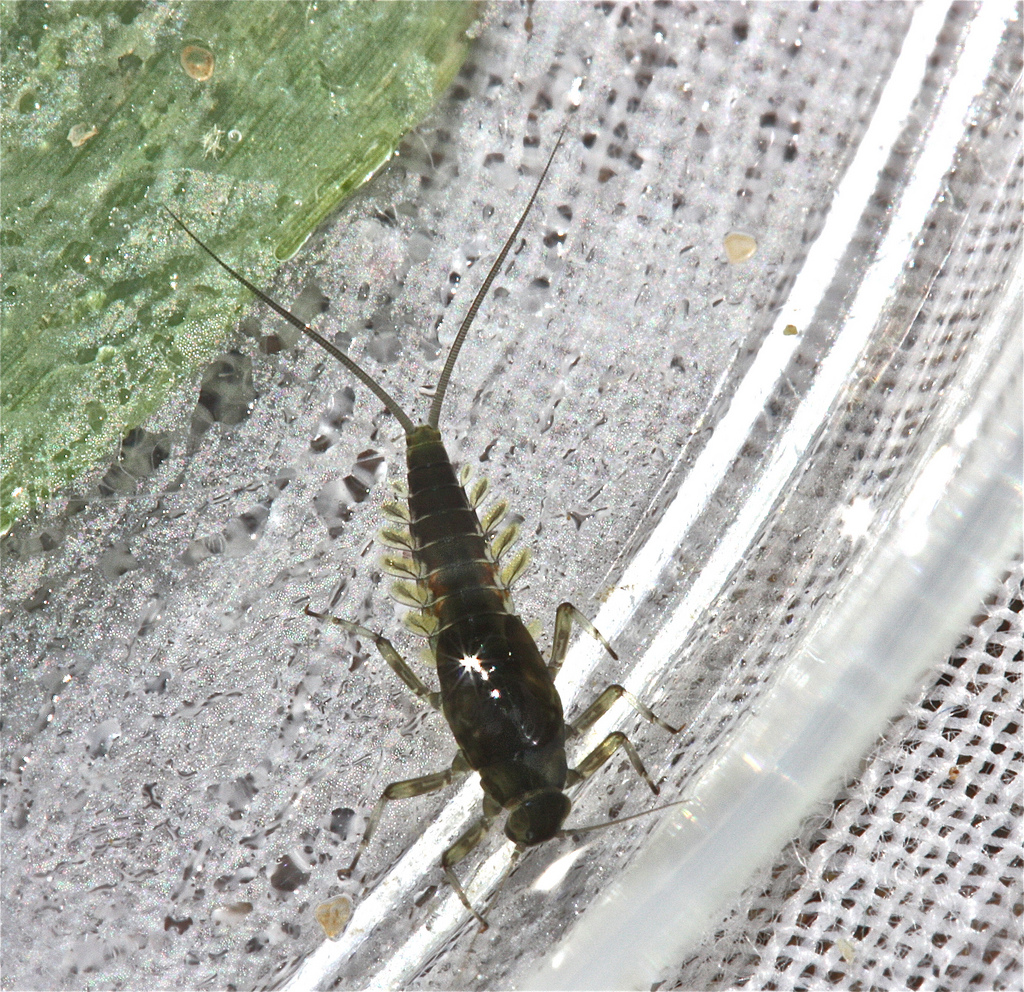

Scientific classification
- Domain: Eukaryota
- Kingdom: Animalia
- Phylum: Arthropoda
- Class: Insecta
- Order: Ephemeroptera
- Family: Baetidae
- Genus: Heterocloeon; McDunnough, 1925

Synonyms
- Rheobaetis Müller-Liebenau, 1974

= Heterocloeon =

Genus of mayflies

Heterocloeon is a genus of small minnow mayflies in the family Baetidae. There are about nine described species in Heterocloeon.

== Species ==
These nine species belong to the genus Heterocloeon:

- Heterocloeon amplum (Traver, 1932)^{i c g b}
- Heterocloeon anoka (Daggy, 1945)^{c g}
- Heterocloeon berneri (Müller-Liebenau, 1974)^{i c g}
- Heterocloeon curiosum (McDunnough, 1923)^{i c g b}
- Heterocloeon davidi Waltz & McCafferty, 2005^{c g}
- Heterocloeon frivolum (McDunnough, 1925)^{i c g}
- Heterocloeon grande (Wiersema and Long, 2000)^{i c g}
- Heterocloeon petersi (Müller-Liebenau, 1974)^{i c g b}
- Heterocloeon rubrolaterale (McDunnough, 1931)^{c g}

Data sources: i = ITIS, c = Catalogue of Life, g = GBIF, b = Bugguide.net
