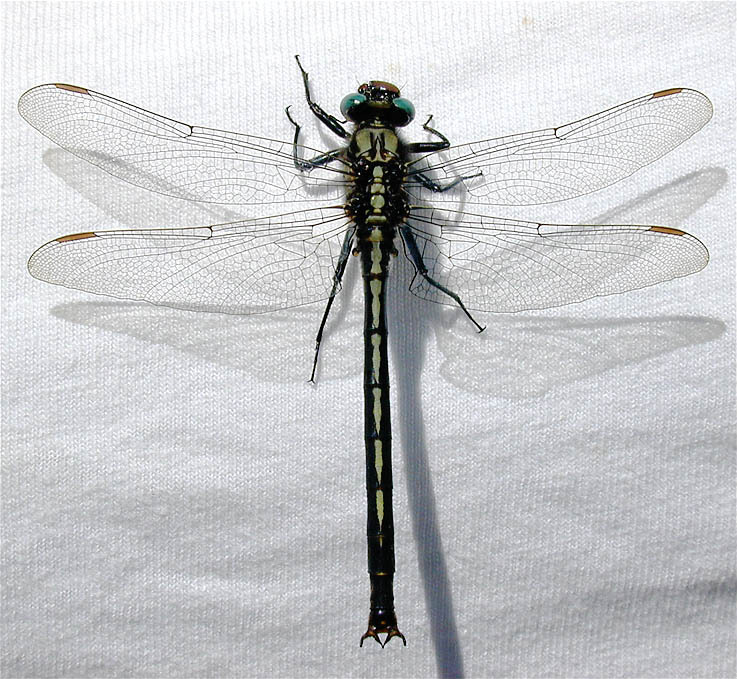

Conservation status
- Least Concern (IUCN 3.1)

Scientific classification
- Kingdom: Animalia
- Phylum: Arthropoda
- Class: Insecta
- Order: Odonata
- Infraorder: Anisoptera
- Family: Gomphidae
- Genus: Arigomphus
- Species: A. cornutus

Binomial name
- Arigomphus cornutus (Tough, 1900)

= Horned clubtail =

Species of dragonfly

The horned clubtail (Arigomphus cornutus) is a clubtail dragonfly of Canada and the United States.

The horned clubtail is 2.2 inches (56 mm) long and lacks an abdominal club. It has a greenish thorax with black stripes and a black abdomen with a light stripe along the top. It has blue eyes and black legs. It also has distinctive wide forked yellow claspers shaped like cow horns and a large sloped bridge between the eyes.

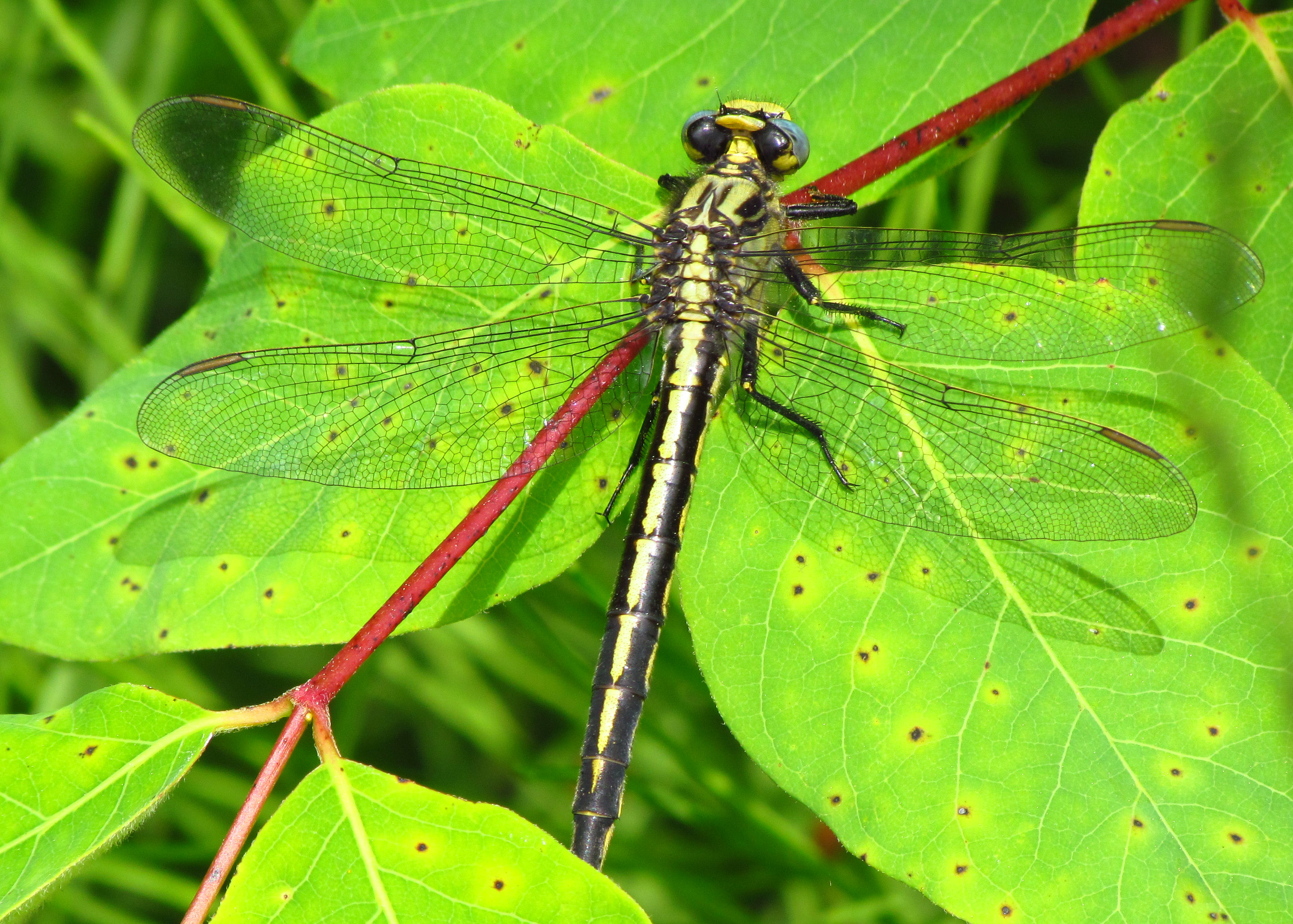
Ottawa, Ontario

The horned clubtail lives in ponds and sluggish streams. Its range includes Canada and several U.S. states:

- Colorado
- Iowa
- Minnesota
- Montana – Carter, Custer, Fallon, Powder River, and Wibaux Counties; only in artificial reservoirs.
- Nebraska – Cherry and Cuming Counties
- New York – (rarely)
- North Dakota
- South Dakota
- Wisconsin
- Wyoming
