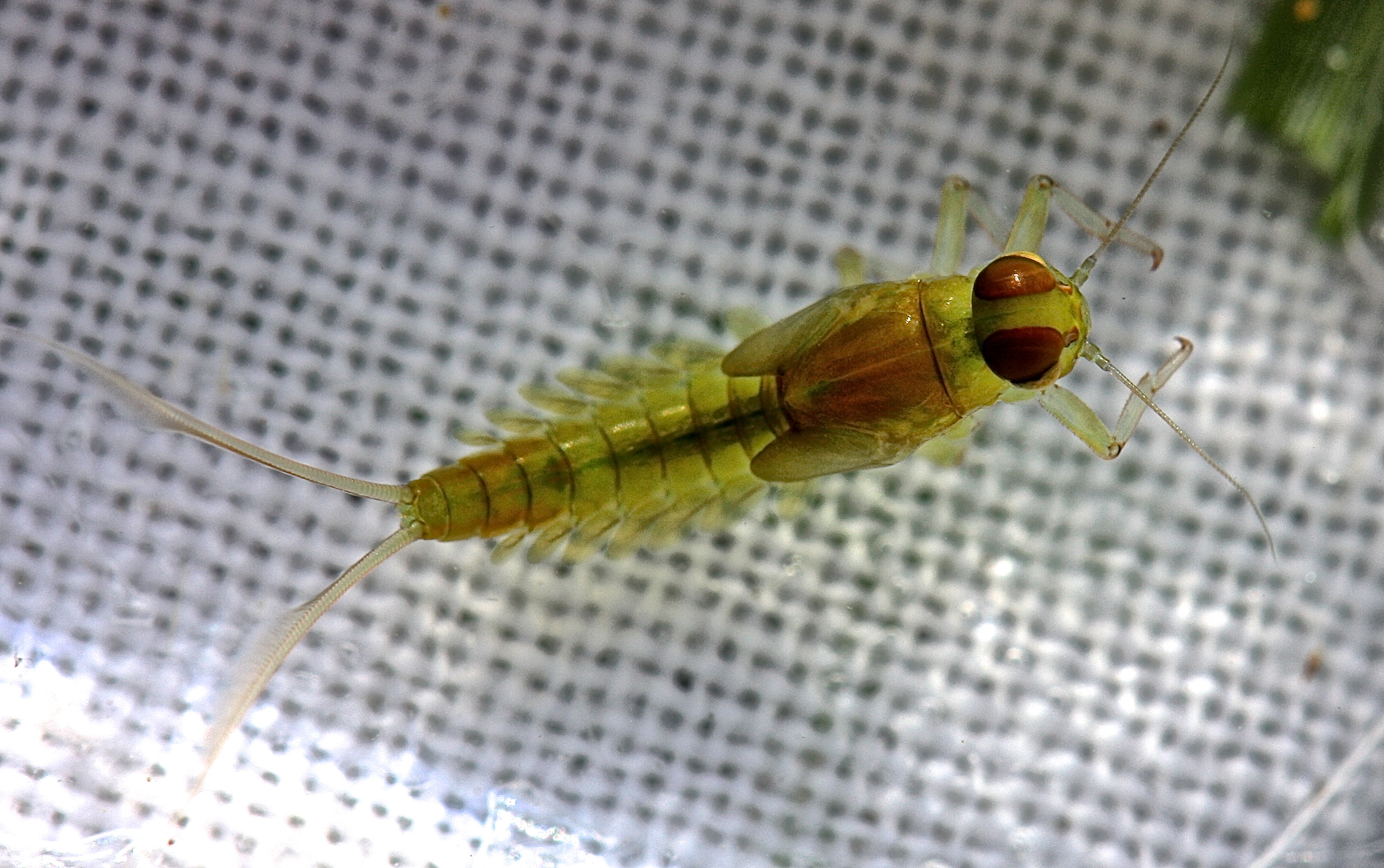

Scientific classification
- Domain: Eukaryota
- Kingdom: Animalia
- Phylum: Arthropoda
- Class: Insecta
- Order: Ephemeroptera
- Family: Baetidae
- Genus: Heterocloeon
- Species: H. petersi

Binomial name
- Heterocloeon petersi (Müller-Liebenau, 1974)

Synonyms
- Rheobaetis petersi Müller-Liebenau, 1974

= Heterocloeon petersi =

Species of mayfly

Heterocloeon petersi is a species of small minnow mayfly in the family Baetidae. It is found in the southeastern United States.
