= William L. Peters =

William L. Peters

William L. Peters (1939–2000) was an American entomologist specializing in mayflies, especially those in the family Leptophlebiidae.

== Biography ==
William Lee Peters was born in Leavenworth, Kansas. His father was an electrical engineer; the family moved to New Orleans so that he could work on military aircraft during the Second World War. He gained his B.A. degree at the University of Kansas in 1960. He earned his M.S. in zoology and entomology at the University of Utah in 1962. In 1966, under George F. Edmunds Jr., he completed his PhD, also at Utah, on the taxonomy of the Leptophlebiidae, a family of mayflies. During his studies he travelled to Peru, Jamaica, New Guinea, Thailand and then India to collect mayfly specimens. He immediately joined the faculty at Florida A&M University, tasked with creating a program in entomology there, following the work of Margaret S. Collins at the university. He headed that program there until his death, serving also as research director of the university's College of Engineering Sciences, Technology and Agriculture. He became a full professor there in 1974. He organized the first International Conference on Ephemeroptera in 1970, and chaired the conference's committee for the rest of his life, helping to organize all eight of the 4-yearly conferences held in that period. He served, too, as president of the Florida Entomological Society.

He wrote 108 papers on Ephemeroptera, mainly on their taxonomy. He defined more than 60 new genera or subgenera of mayflies, and published formal descriptions of many new mayfly species. Among his many specialist studies was that of the ecology of Dolania americana, a "strange" and rare sand-burrowing mayfly that needs a short Arctic year for its egg to develop, and a second year for the nymphs, while the adult lives for only about one hour.

Peters was for 36 years married to the entomologist Janice G. Peters, who went on collecting trips with him and wrote some 20 papers together with him. She, their daughter, and four grandchildren survived him.
