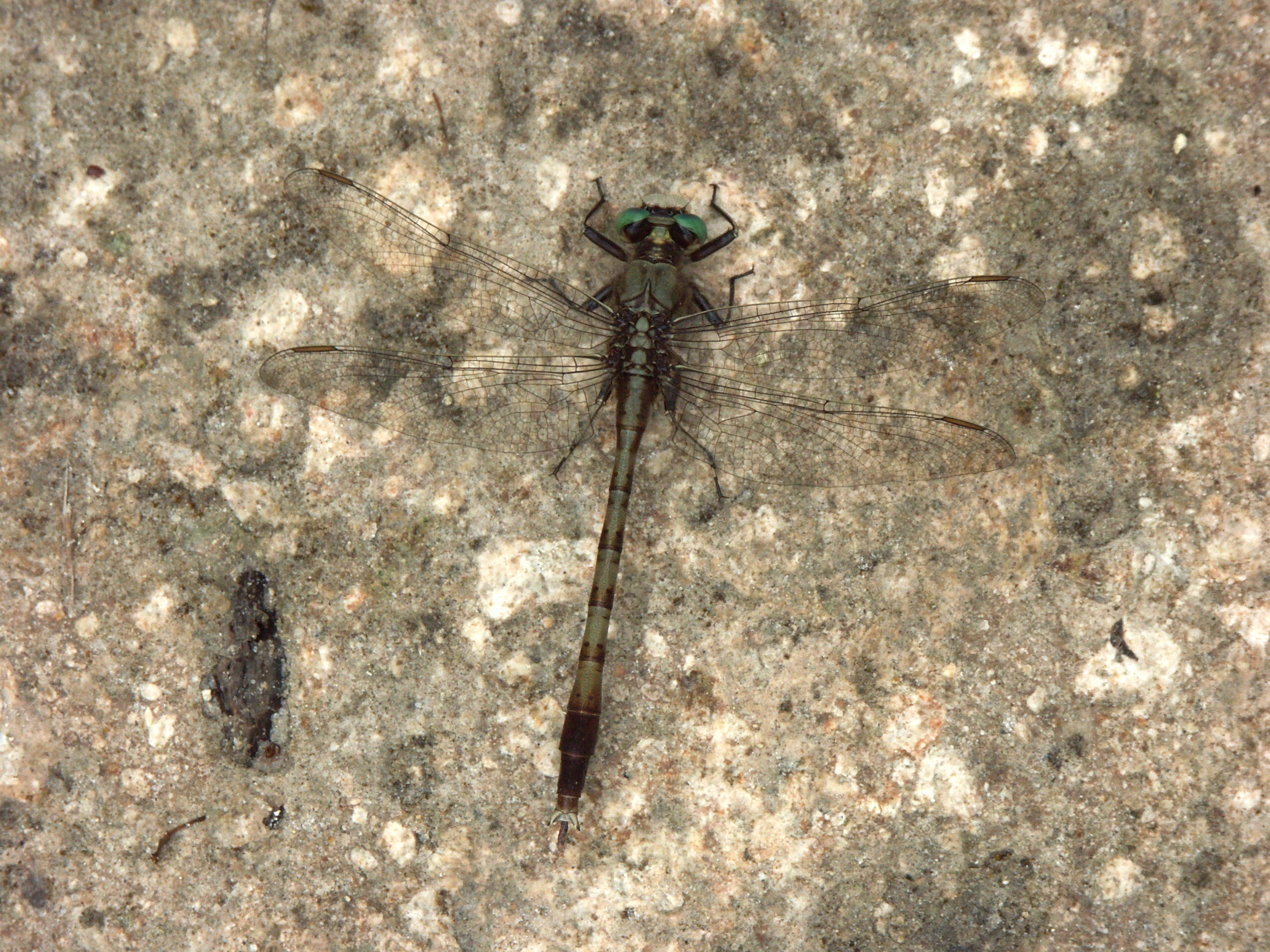

Conservation status
- Least Concern (IUCN 3.1)

Scientific classification
- Domain: Eukaryota
- Kingdom: Animalia
- Phylum: Arthropoda
- Class: Insecta
- Order: Odonata
- Infraorder: Anisoptera
- Family: Gomphidae
- Genus: Arigomphus
- Species: A. pallidus

Binomial name
- Arigomphus pallidus (Rambur, 1842)

Synonyms
- Gomphus pallidus Rambur, 1842

= Arigomphus pallidus =

Species of dragonfly

Arigomphus pallidus, the gray-green clubtail, is a species of clubtail in the family of dragonflies known as Gomphidae. It is found in North America.

The IUCN conservation status of Arigomphus pallidus is "LC", least concern, with no immediate threat to the species' survival. The population is stable.

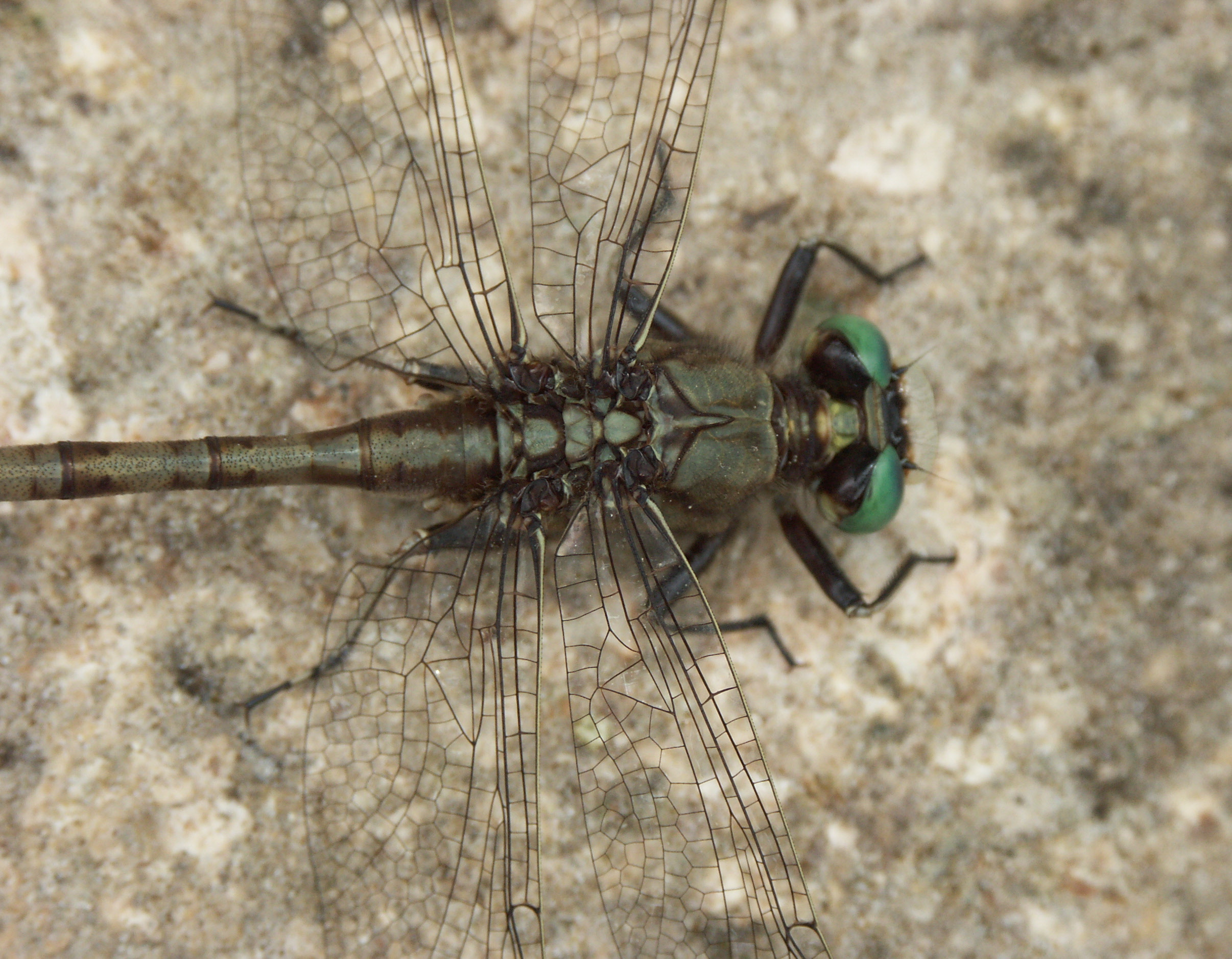
Gray-green clubtail, Arigomphus pallidus
