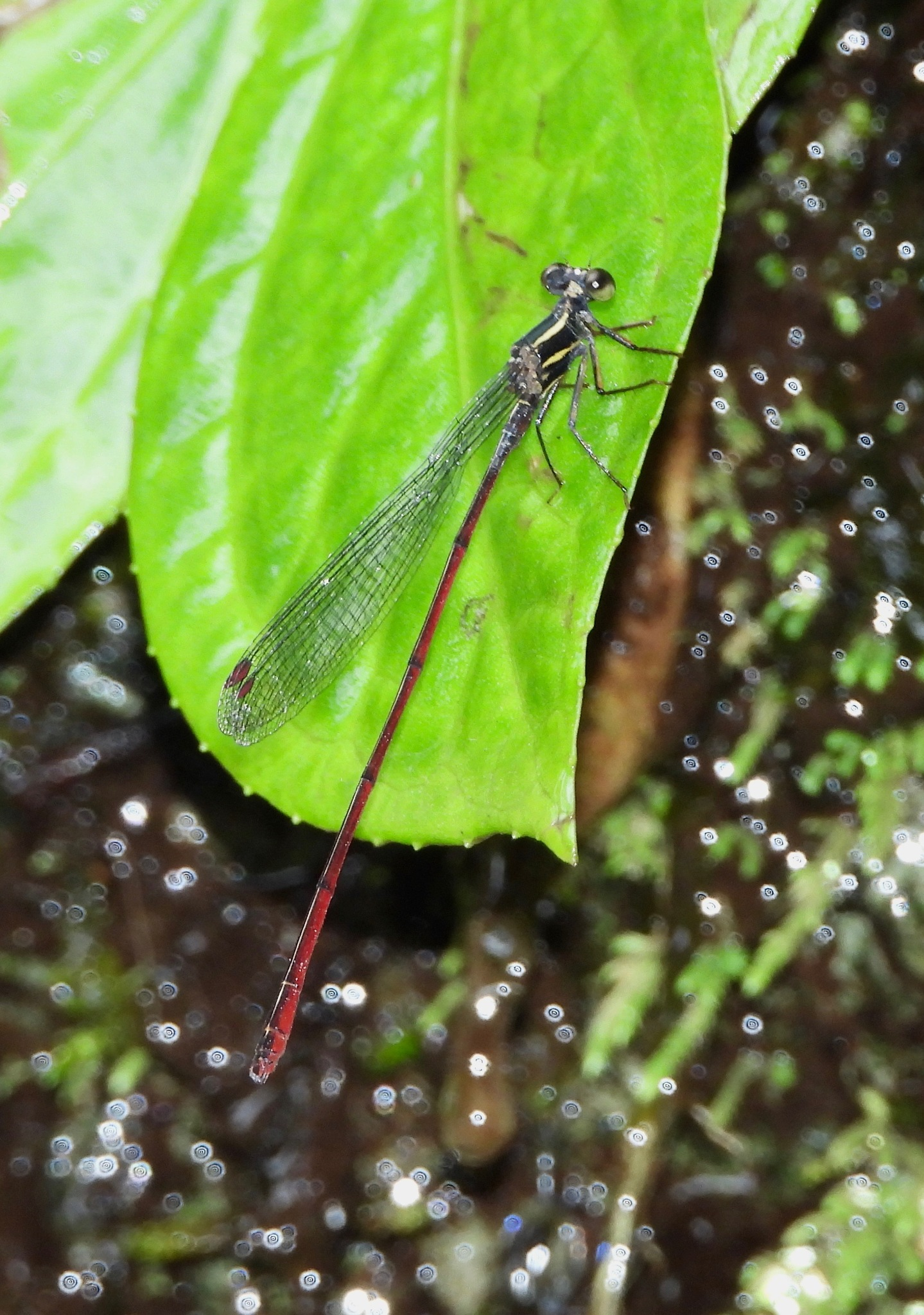

Conservation status
- Least Concern (IUCN 3.1)

Scientific classification
- Kingdom: Animalia
- Phylum: Arthropoda
- Clade: Pancrustacea
- Class: Insecta
- Order: Odonata
- Suborder: Zygoptera
- Superfamily: Polythoroidea
- Family: Mesagrionidae; Kalkman & Sanchez Herrera, 2021
- Genus: Mesagrion; Selys, 1885
- Species: M. leucorrhinum

Binomial name
- Mesagrion leucorrhinum Selys, 1885
- Distribution of Mesagrion leucorrhinum

= Mesagrion leucorrhinum =

Species of damselfly

Mesagrion leucorrhinum is a species of damselfly endemic to the Andes of central Colombia. It is the sole species in the genus Mesagrion, which in turn is the only genus in the family Mesagrionidae, which is a family in the superfamily Polythoroidea.

Mesagrion leucorrhinum inhabits small waterfalls and forest streams in subtropical and tropical montane forests. Adults are medium-sized damselflies with clear wings, a black body marked with yellow, and a largely red abdomen. The species is assessed as being of least concern on the IUCN Red List.

Mesagrionidae remains one of the smallest damselfly families, containing a single genus and species.

== Family classification ==
Mesagrion was described by Selys in 1885 for the species Mesagrion leucorrhinum. For much of its history the genus was placed within Megapodagrionidae, usually among the flatwing damselflies of the subfamily Argiolestinae. Molecular studies later showed that Mesagrion represents a distinct evolutionary lineage within the damselflies. As a result, Kalkman and Sanchez Herrera established the monotypic family Mesagrionidae in 2021.

In 2026, Carter and colleagues placed Mesagrionidae within the newly recognised superfamily Polythoroidea, together with Dicteriadidae, Heteragrionidae, Hypolestidae, Philogeniidae, Polythoridae and Rimanellidae, based on phylogenomic evidence for their evolutionary relationships.

== Etymology ==
The family name Mesagrionidae is derived from the type genus Mesagrion, with the standard zoological suffix -idae used for animal families.

The genus name Mesagrion presumably combines the Greek μέσος (mesos, "middle" or "intermediate") with Agrion, a historical name widely used for damselflies. Although Sélys did not explain the derivation, the name probably refers to an intermediate position among the damselfly groups recognised at the time.

The species name leucorrhinum is presumably derived from the Greek λευκός (leukos, "white") and ῥίς (rhis, "nose" or "snout"). It likely refers to the white labrum and clypeus described in the original species description.
