= Jay Traver =

American entomologist (1894–1974)

Jay R Traver (Note: Her middle name is identical to her father's; it is an 'R' with no trailing period.) (August 2, 1894 (Note: She was born close to midnight, and the recorded date was apparently August 3, 1894, but her family stated that she was born before midnight on the 2nd, and always used that date.) – September 5, 1974) was an American entomologist who studied and published about mayflies. She described over 200 new species and contributed to the reorganization of the systematics of the entire order. She has been called "the first Ephemeroptera specialist in North America".

Her 1951 publication of a paper titled "Unusual Scalp Dermatitis in Humans Caused by the Mite, Dermatophagoides (Acarina, epidermoptidae)" about her own symptoms led to a retrospective diagnosis of delusional parasitosis.

== Early life ==
Jay R Traver was born in August 1894 and raised in Willoughby, Ohio. Her parents were Mabel Matilda Dodd and Jay R Traver; her father was a railroad engineer who died in a railroad accident three weeks before she was born. Her mother and her aunt Sara Dodd taught her before she reached school age. She earned her bachelor's degree at Cornell University between 1914 and 1918, majoring in biology, and studying under Anna Botsford Comstock, and in the ambience of the aquatic entomologist James George Needham. She gained her master's degree in 1919, writing her thesis on the Eastern blacknose dace.

== Career ==
Traver held various jobs after graduating, starting in a New York cafeteria in 1919, with a spell back in Cornell under Comstock. After 1920, she spent some years as an elementary school supervisor in Wilmington, Delaware, and later served as acting head of biology in Shorter College, Georgia. She then spent six years teaching biology at Women's College, University of North Carolina at Greensboro. She used that time to study the mayflies of North Carolina, collecting and raising specimens.

In 1930, she went back to Cornell, completing her PhD in 1931. From 1931, she published a monograph of North Carolina's mayflies in the Journal of the Elisha Mitchell Scientific Society. Her PhD thesis dissertation was entitled Mayflies of North Carolina. With a Carnegie grant from 1931 to 1937, she collaborated with Needham on what became their 1935 book, The Biology of Mayflies. This was described in 2007 as "the cornerstone of North American mayfly entomology".

In the summer of 1938, she worked briefly as a field secretary for the conservation department of the Biological Survey of New York, moving that same summer to become a zoology instructor at Massachusetts State College. She worked there for the rest of her career; in 1960, she became a full professor. Working with the taxonomist George F. Edmunds in 1954, 1958, and 1959, she reclassified the Ephemeroptera (the Order containing the mayflies) as a whole.

Drawings of wing flattened on downstroke (top) and pleated on upstroke (middle), with section of pleated wing (bottom)

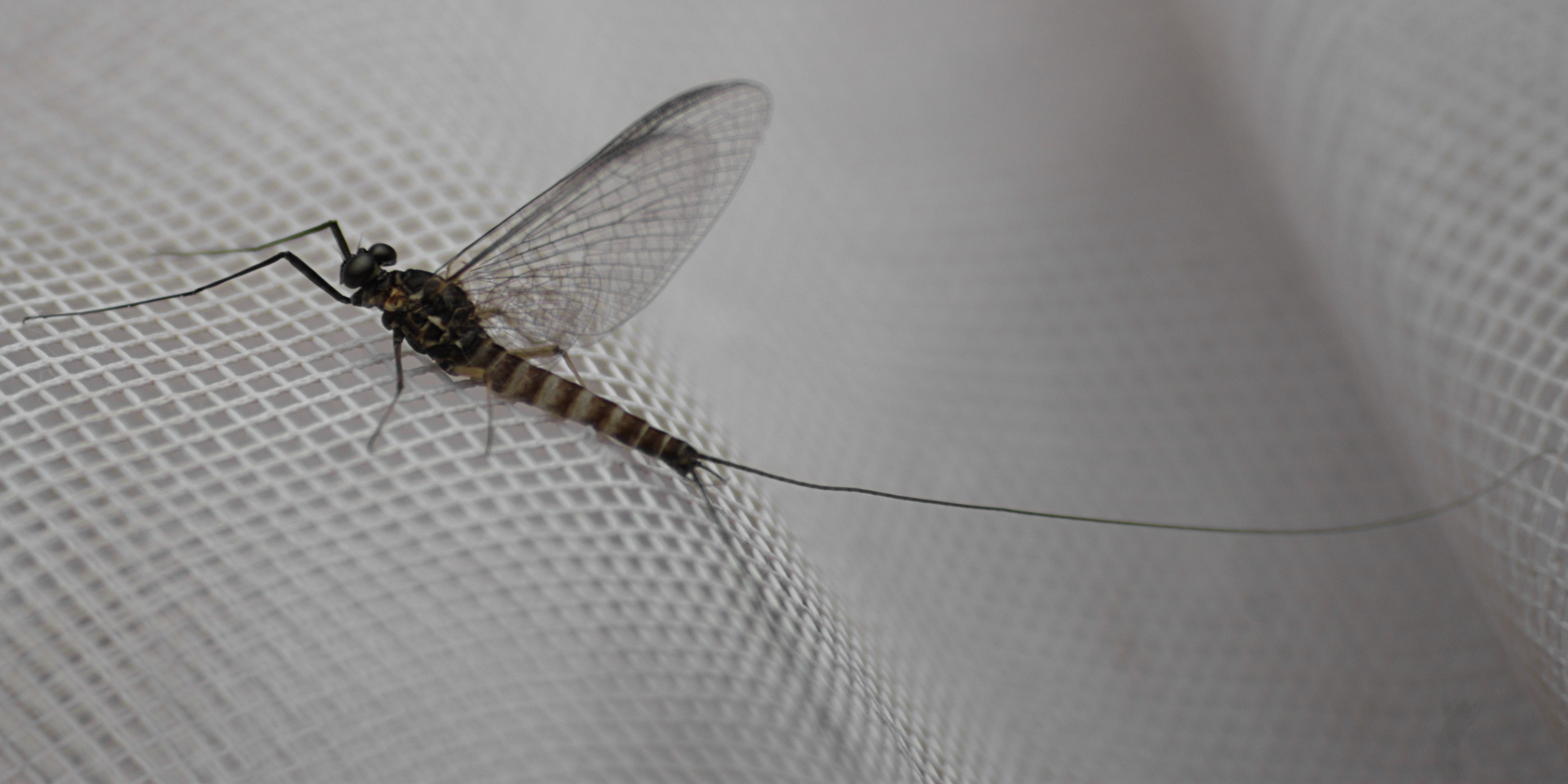
A male Siphlonurus mayfly

The 1954 paper by Edmunds and Traver argued that the primitive mayfly wing is pleated, ideal for the male's up-and-down display flight, but poor for travel.

In 1954, again with Edmunds, she contributed one paper on the wings and flight mechanics of mayflies. The paper argues on the basis of study of the forewing of Siphlonurus that the primitive condition of the mayfly wing is to fold in pleats on the upstroke, fanning out somewhat on the downstroke. The wing thus provided power mainly on the downstroke. More highly evolved mayflies, in their view, have reduced pleating, thus enabling a figure-of-eight "sculling" stroke which provides power on both upstroke and downstroke, enabling more efficient travel.

== Death and legacy ==
Traver was diagnosed with abdominal cancer in 1971. On her death in 1974, the entomologists and mayfly specialists William L. Peters and Janice Peters dedicated an issue of Florida A&M University's Eatonia journal to her, describing her as "the first Ephemeroptera specialist in North America". The issue lists 45 publications by Traver: most are on mayfly systematics, describing new species or documenting the mayflies of a region. She wrote on the mayflies of North America, the Himalayas, Brazil, Costa Rica, Mexico, Puerto Rico, Uruguay, and Venezuela.

== Delusional parasitosis ==
In 1951, Traver published a paper titled "Unusual Scalp Dermatitis in Humans Caused by the Mite, Dermatophagoides (Acarina, epidermoptidae)" summarizing her personal experience. The paper – her only one not about mayflies – has been taken as suggesting delusional parasitosis, a mental disorder in which individuals believe that they have a parasite infestation of the skin. She visited numerous doctors over many years; a dermatologist said her symptoms "were largely imaginary" or resulted from her own "attempt [at self-medication]". She used 22 different chemicals to attempt to rid herself of the infestation.

Matan Shelomi describes the article as ending with a "tirade against the 'medical profession' and her pride in rejecting the dermatologist’s verdict". She claimed in the paper that the cause of her infestation was a rare dust mite. Alex Fain states that Travers' account was wrong, because dust mites do not burrow into human skin. Shelomi describes other inconsistencies, labeling Traver a "textbook case" of delusional parasitosis. Jeffrey Lockwood writes that "Traver's account was a vivid, poignant, and tragic autobiography of a woman driven to desperate measures to affirm the reality of her delusion". Shelomi states that the 1951 paper is "unique ... in that its conclusions may be based on data that was unconsciously fabricated by the author's mind". He argues that the paper warrants retraction, and that it has done "permanent and lasting damage" to people with delusional parasitosis. Together with higher rates of the related delusion of Morgellons, he says papers enabling delusions may increase without stricter journal publishing standards. Lockwood asserts that Traver was responsible for "one of the most remarkable mistakes ever published in a scientific entomological journal".

== Honors and distinctions ==
Traver described some 235 species of mayfly new to science. She created 14 mayfly genera or subgenera. Other entomologists named six mayfly species and two genera after her. She was the honorary chairman of the First International Conference on Ephemeroptera at Florida A&M University in 1970, where she was given an achievement plaque and a key to the city of Tallahassee.

== Works ==
- Needham, James G.; Traver, Jay R; Hsu, Yin-chi (1935). The Biology of Mayflies with a Systematic Account of North American Species. Ithaca, New York: Comstock. pp. 759, color frontispiece, monochrome illustrations, diagrams. OCLC 814047.
