= George F. Edmunds (entomologist) =

American entomologist

George F. Edmunds Jr.

George F. Edmunds Jr. (April 28, 1920–March 4, 2006) was an American entomologist specialising in mayflies. He has been called "the greatest of living North American researchers on Ephemeroptera", and "the first biogeographer of Ephemeroptera".

== Biography ==
George F. Edmunds Jr. was born in Salt Lake City, Utah to George F. Edmunds and Fern E. Barratt. He joined the U.S. Naval Reserve in 1941 but was discharged on medical grounds. He gained his B.S. degree from the University of Utah in 1943, and his M.S. also at Utah in 1946, serving as an instructor in the biology department. He completed his Ph.D. at the University of Massachusetts in 1952, collaborating with Jay R Traver. He returned to the University of Utah to join its biology faculty, remaining there until he retired in 1989. He continued his work on mayflies until his death in 2006. He pursued a second interest on plant-pest interactions, based on a study of the black pineleaf scale insect.

Edmunds, with Traver, reworked the taxonomy of the Ephemeroptera, starting in 1954. In 1979, with W. P. McCafferty, he proposed a new "higher classification" of the group, with two suborders, Pannota and Schistonota.

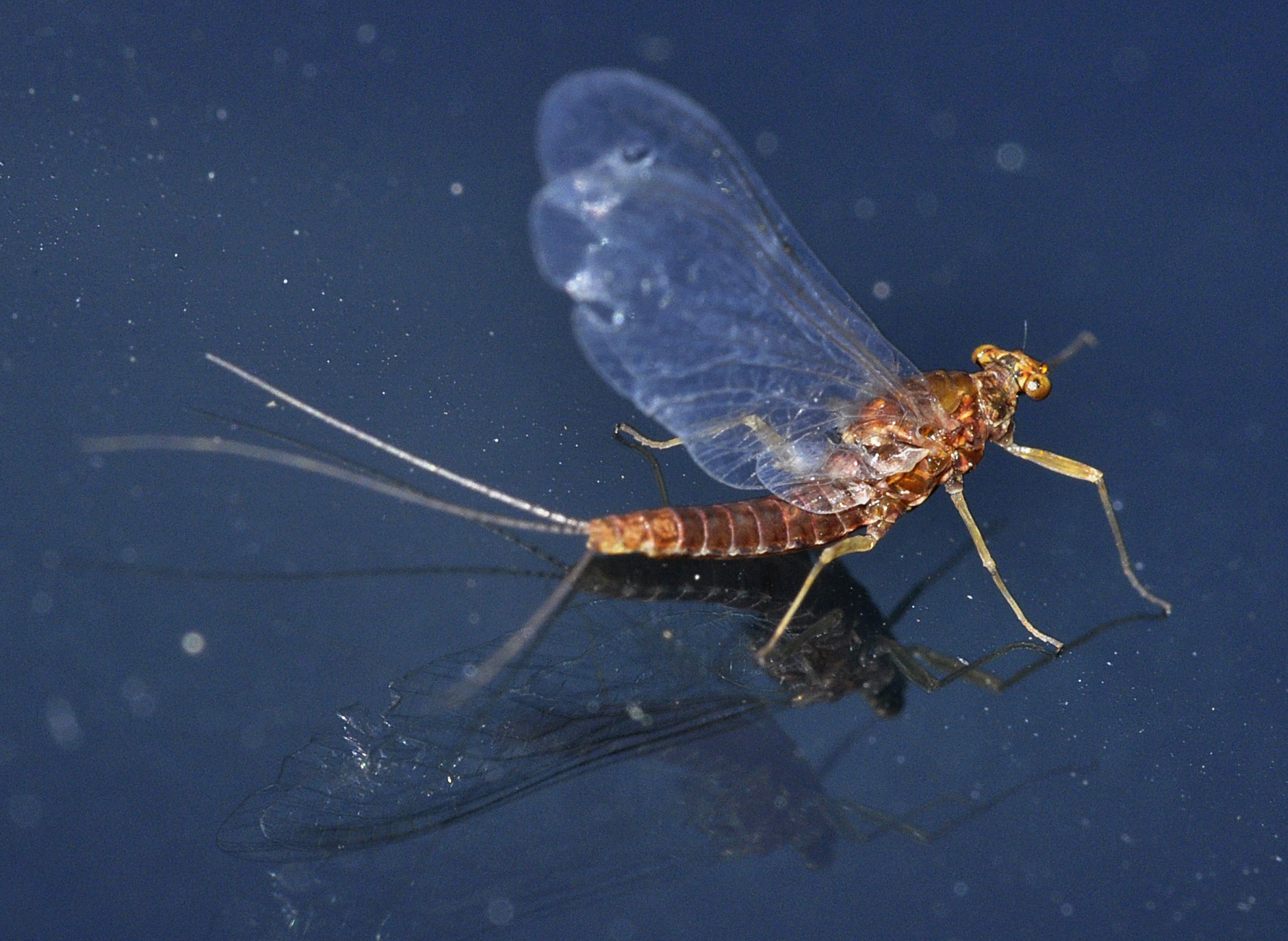
Serratella (S. ignita pictured) is one of 35 mayfly genera named by Edmunds.

Edmunds described and named 35 new genera and 79 new species of mayfly.

== Honors and distinctions ==
The 7th International Conference on Ephemeroptera, at the University of Maine in August 1992, was dedicated to Edmunds. The mayfly experts Janice G. Peters and Michael D. Hubbard described him as "the greatest of living North American researchers on Ephemeroptera". W. P. McCafferty, making the dedicatory address at that conference, called him "the first biogeographer of Ephemeroptera", and listed 114 of his publications on mayflies. Ten species and two genera (Edmundsius and Edmundsula) of mayfly are named after him, along with a beetle, a cranefly, and a stonefly.

His book on the mayflies of North and Central America has been described as "the benchmark upon which all subsequent taxonomic research in the area is measured. His study of the subimago of the mayfly has been described as "monumental, demonstrating his acute ability to synthesize his observations and knowledge of systematics, phylogeny, morphology, paleontology, developmental biology, behaviour and ecology into unified explanatory theories".

== Works ==
- Edmunds, George F.; Jensen, Steven L.; Berner, Lewis (1976). The Mayflies of North and Central America. University of Minnesota Press. ISBN 978-0-8166-0759-4.
- Edmunds, George F.; McCafferty, W. P. (1988). "The mayfly subimago" (PDF). Annual Review of Entomology. 33 (1): 509–527.
