= James George Needham =

American entomologist

James George Needham (March 16, 1868 in Virginia, Illinois – July 24, 1957) was an American entomologist.

After studying with John Henry Comstock at Cornell University (1896–1898) he taught biology at Lake Forest University (1898–1907). In 1908 returned to Cornell as assistant professor of limnology. When Comstock retired in 1914, Needham became head of the Department of Entomology at Cornell until his retirement in 1935. Needham published numerous scientific articles, educational papers, and textbooks but is best known for the Comstock–Needham system for describing insect wing venation.

He was a Member of the Entomological Society of America, the American Association for the Advancement of Science and the Limnological Society of America.

== See also ==
- Jay Traver
- Category:Taxa named by James George Needham
