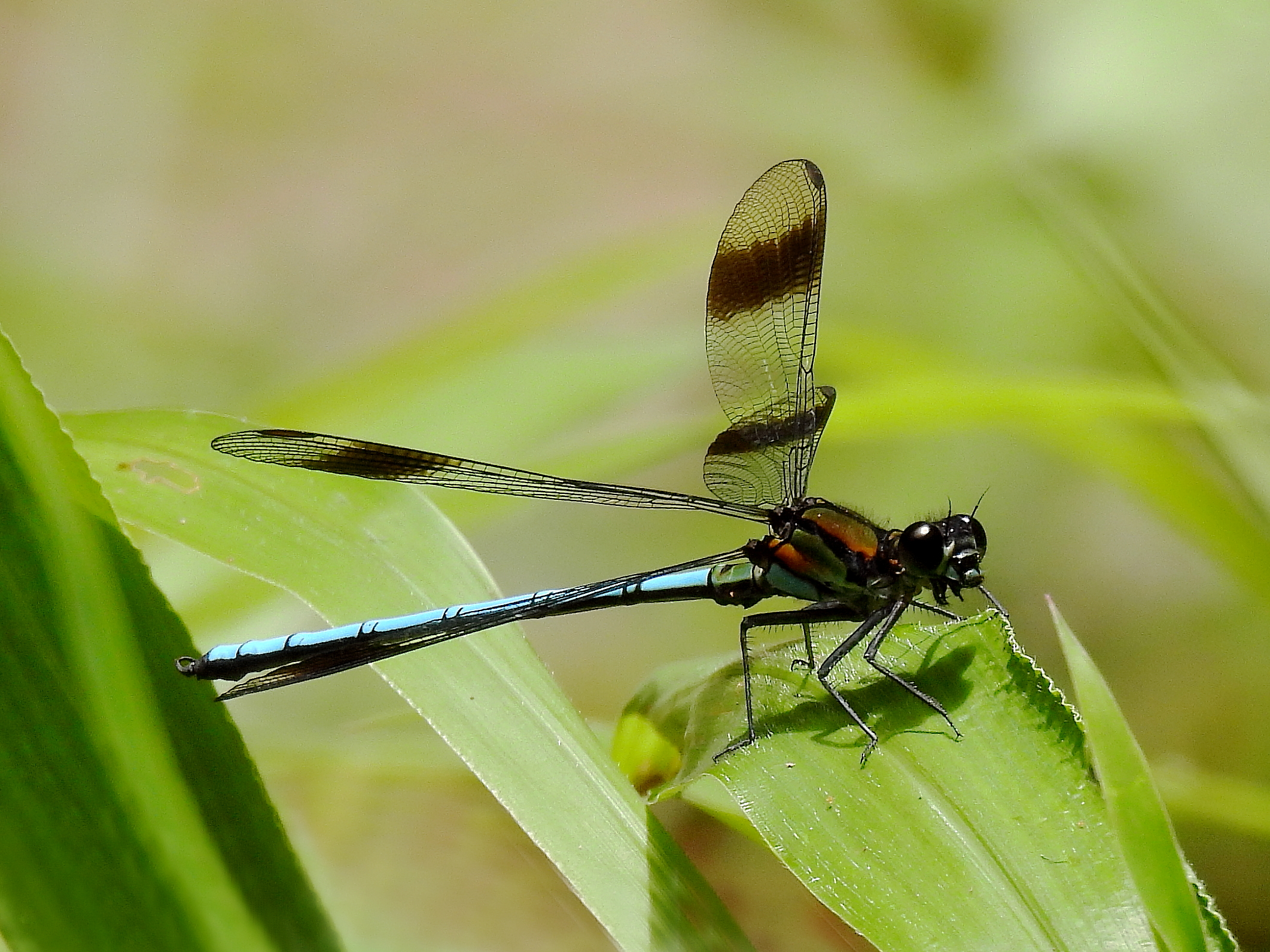
- Male, Mount Lewis, Queensland

Conservation status
- Near Threatened (IUCN 3.1)

Scientific classification
- Kingdom: Animalia
- Phylum: Arthropoda
- Clade: Pancrustacea
- Class: Insecta
- Order: Odonata
- Suborder: Zygoptera
- Family: Lestoideidae
- Genus: Diphlebia
- Species: D. hybridoides

Binomial name
- Diphlebia hybridoides Tillyard, 1912

= Diphlebia hybridoides =

Giant rockmaster

Species of damselfly

Diphlebia hybridoides is a species of Australian damselfly in the family Lestoideidae, commonly known as a giant rockmaster. It is endemic to north-eastern Queensland, where it inhabits streams in forests.

Diphlebia hybridoides is a large, solid-looking damselfly with striking blue-grey and black colouring. It sits with its dark-banded wings spread out.

== Etymology ==
The genus name Diphlebia is derived from the Greek δίς (dis, "twice" or "double") and φλέψ (phleps, "vein"), likely referring to distinctive wing venation.

The species name hybridoides is derived from the Latin hybrida ("hybrid" or "crossbred") and the suffix -ώδης (-ōdēs, "resembling"), referring to similarities with both Diphlebia euphoeoides and Diphlebia lestoides.

== Gallery ==
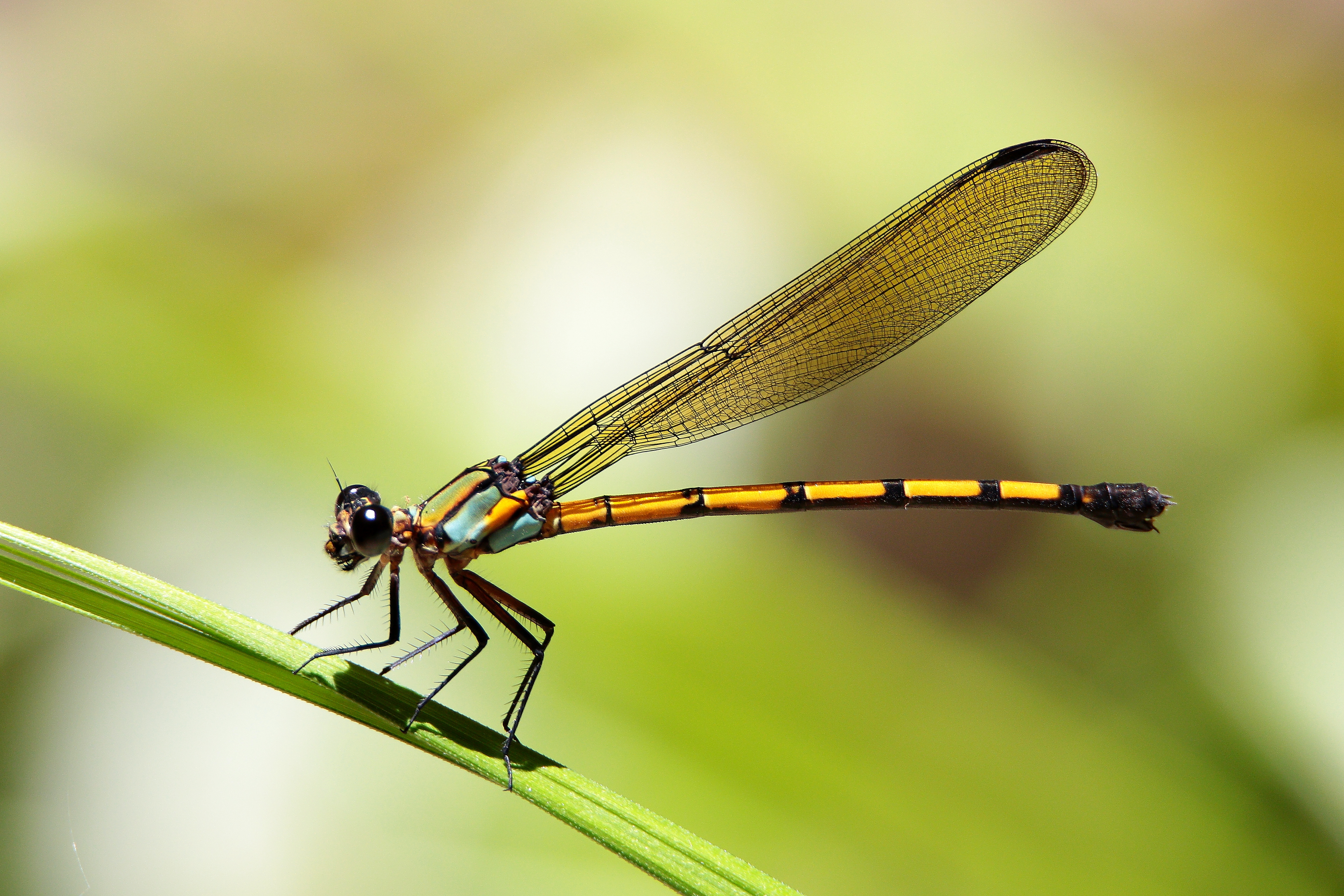
female

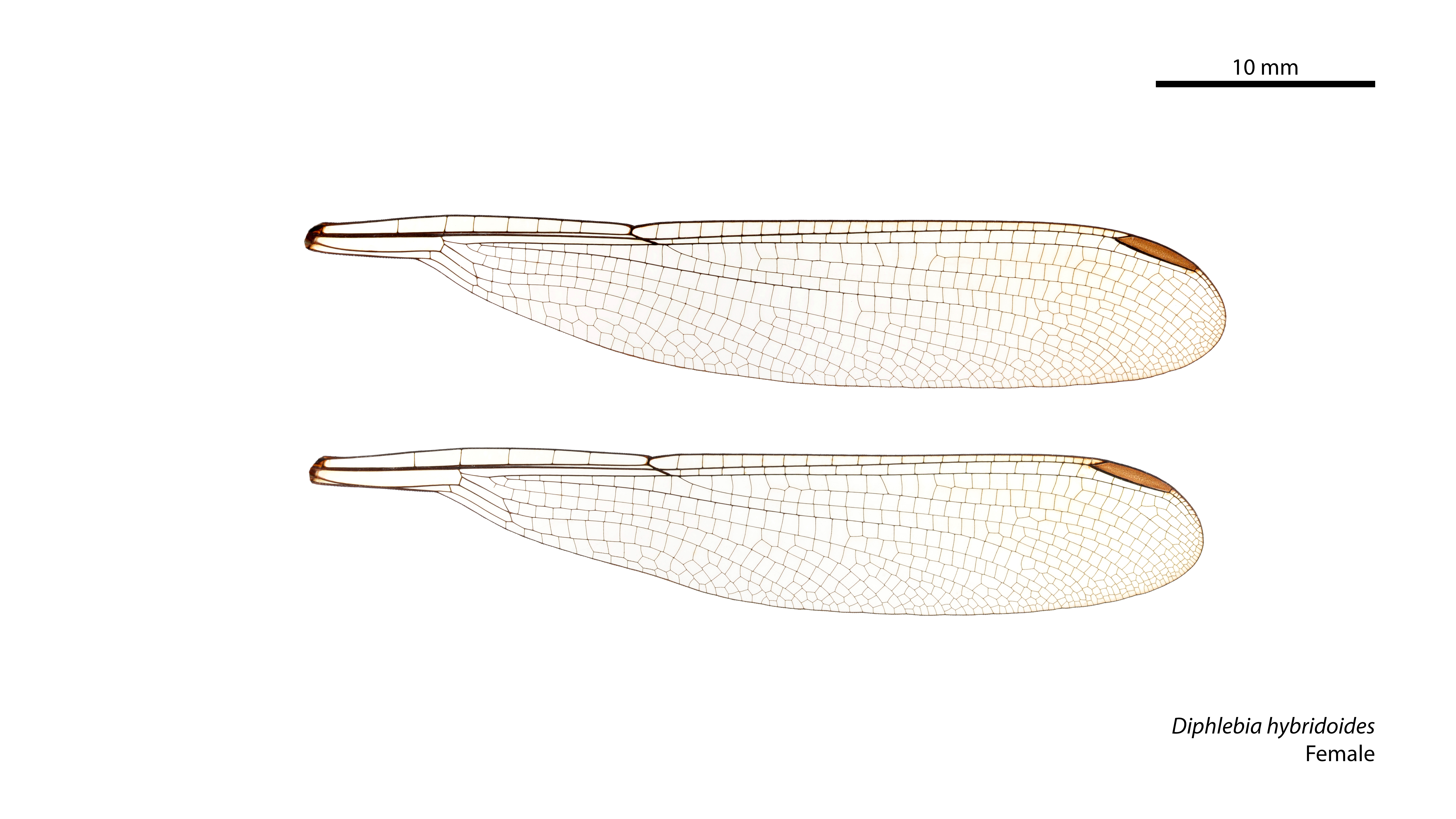
Female wings

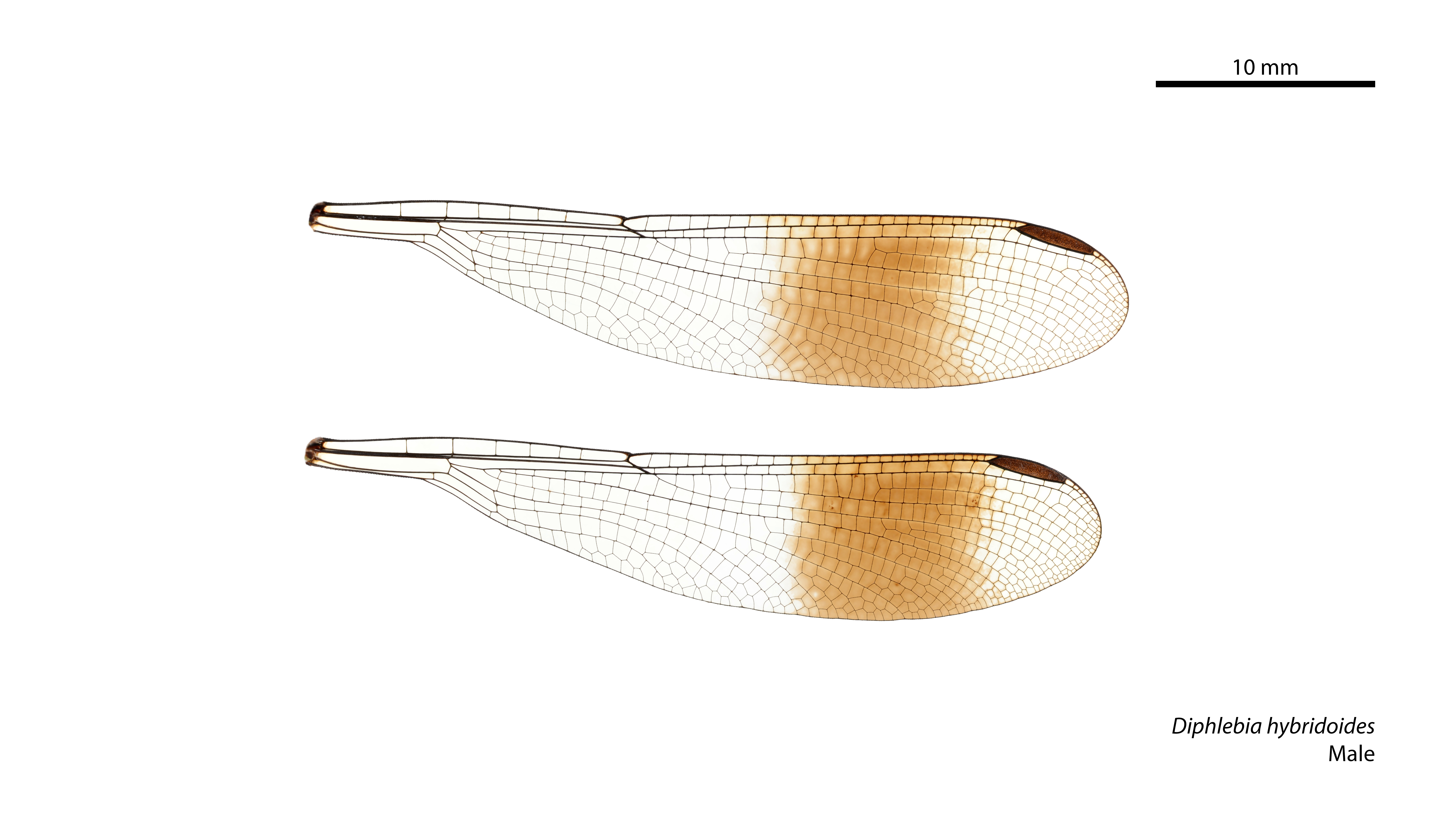
Male wings

== See also ==
- List of Odonata species of Australia
