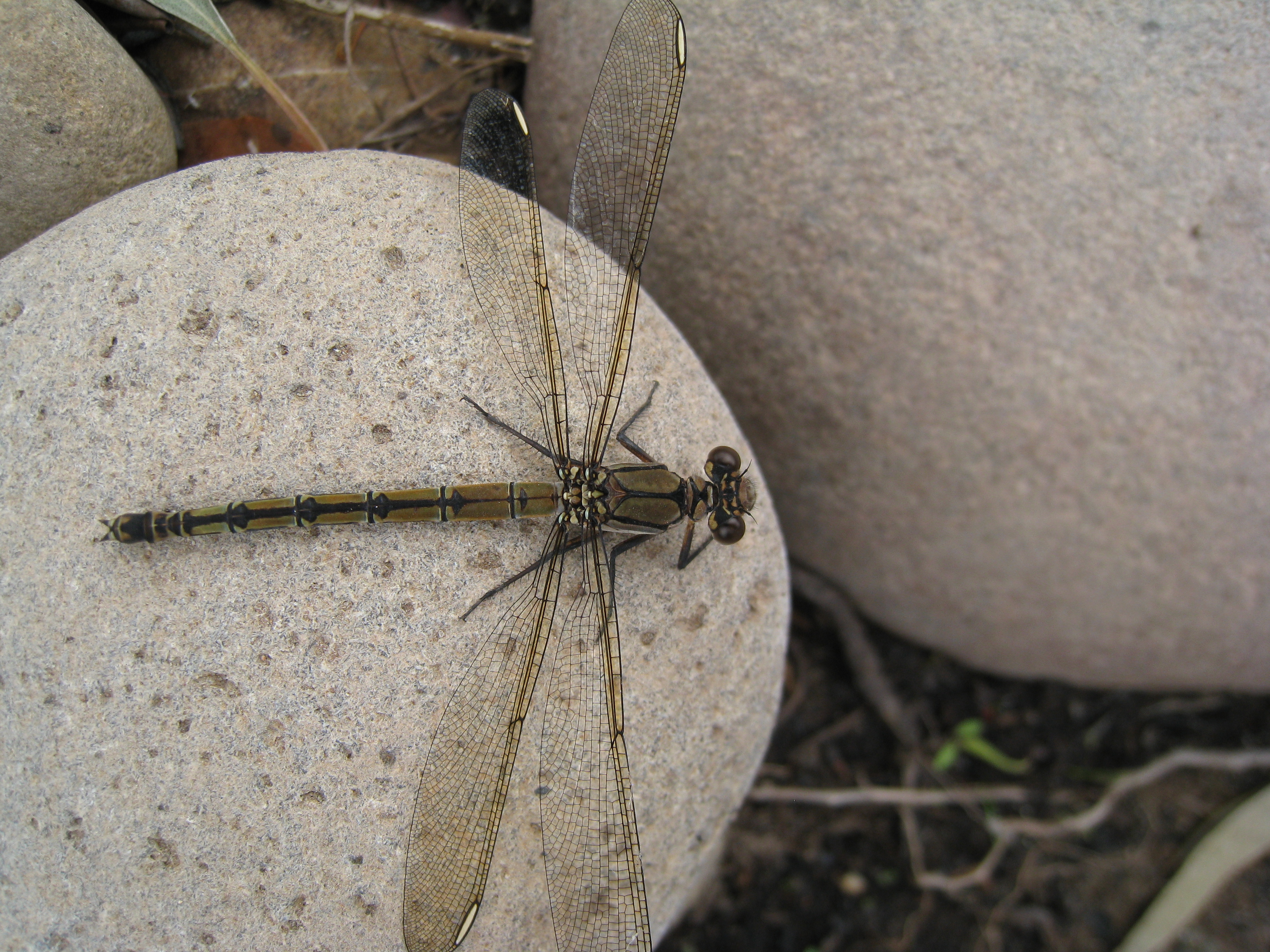
- Diphlebia nymphoides

Conservation status
- Least Concern (IUCN 3.1)

Scientific classification
- Kingdom: Animalia
- Phylum: Arthropoda
- Clade: Pancrustacea
- Class: Insecta
- Order: Odonata
- Suborder: Zygoptera
- Family: Lestoideidae
- Genus: Diphlebia
- Species: D. nymphoides

Binomial name
- Diphlebia nymphoides Tillyard, 1912

= Diphlebia nymphoides =

Arrowhead rockmaster

Species of damselfly

Diphlebia nymphoides is a species of Australian damselfly in the family Lestoideidae, commonly known as an arrowhead rockmaster. It is endemic to eastern Australia, where it inhabits streams and rivers.

Diphlebia nymphoides is a large, solid-looking damselfly; the adult male is a brilliant blue colour with a black and blue striped tail, while the female has a more muted colouring. It sits with its lightly tinted wings spread out.

== Etymology ==
The genus name Diphlebia is derived from the Greek δίς (dis, "twice" or "double") and φλέψ (phleps, "vein"), likely referring to distinctive wing venation.

The species name nymphoides is derived from the Greek νύμφη (nymphē, "bride" or "nymph") and the suffix -ώδης (-ōdēs, "resembling"), alluding to its beauty.

== Gallery ==
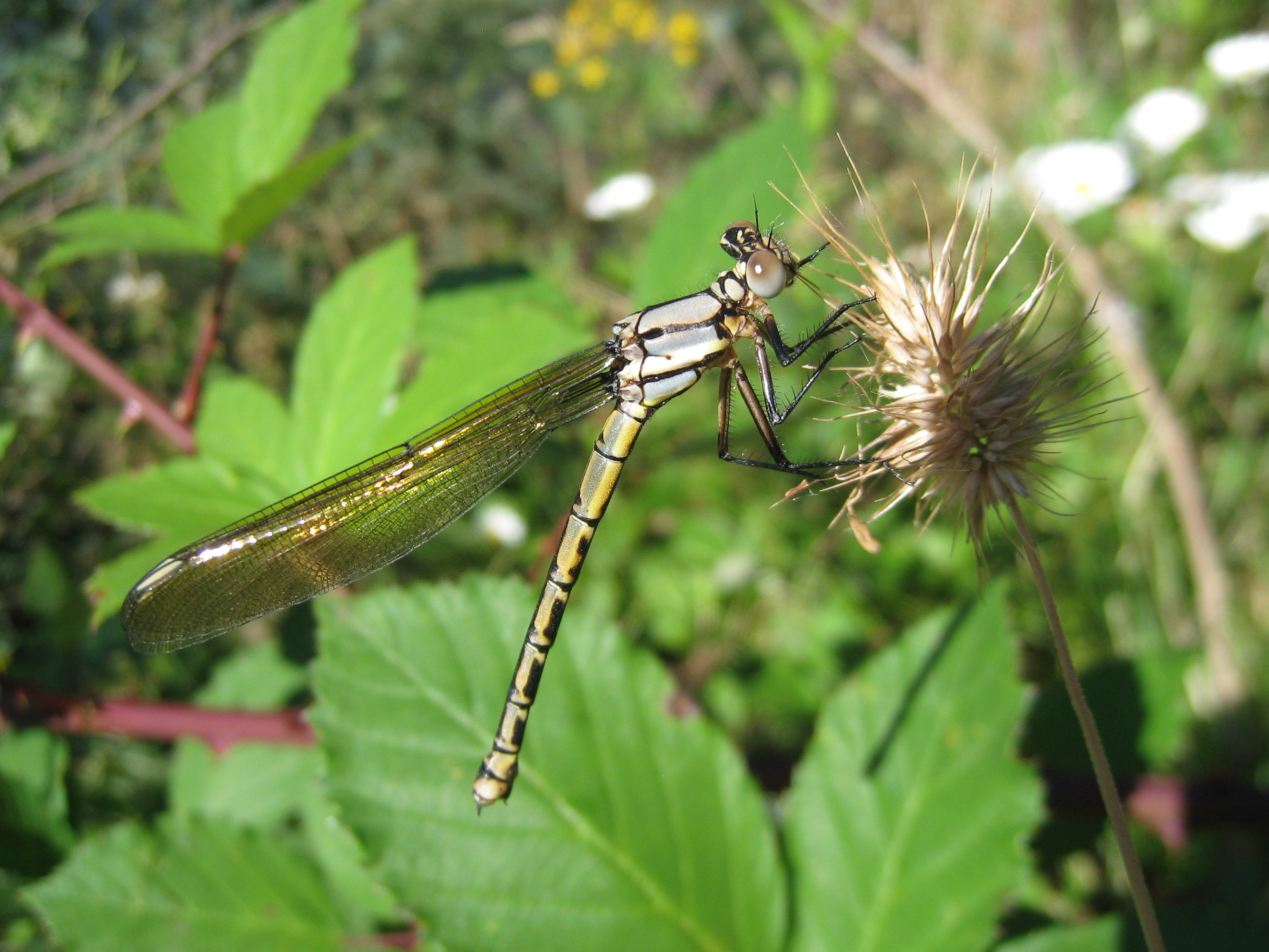
Male Diphlebia nymphoides

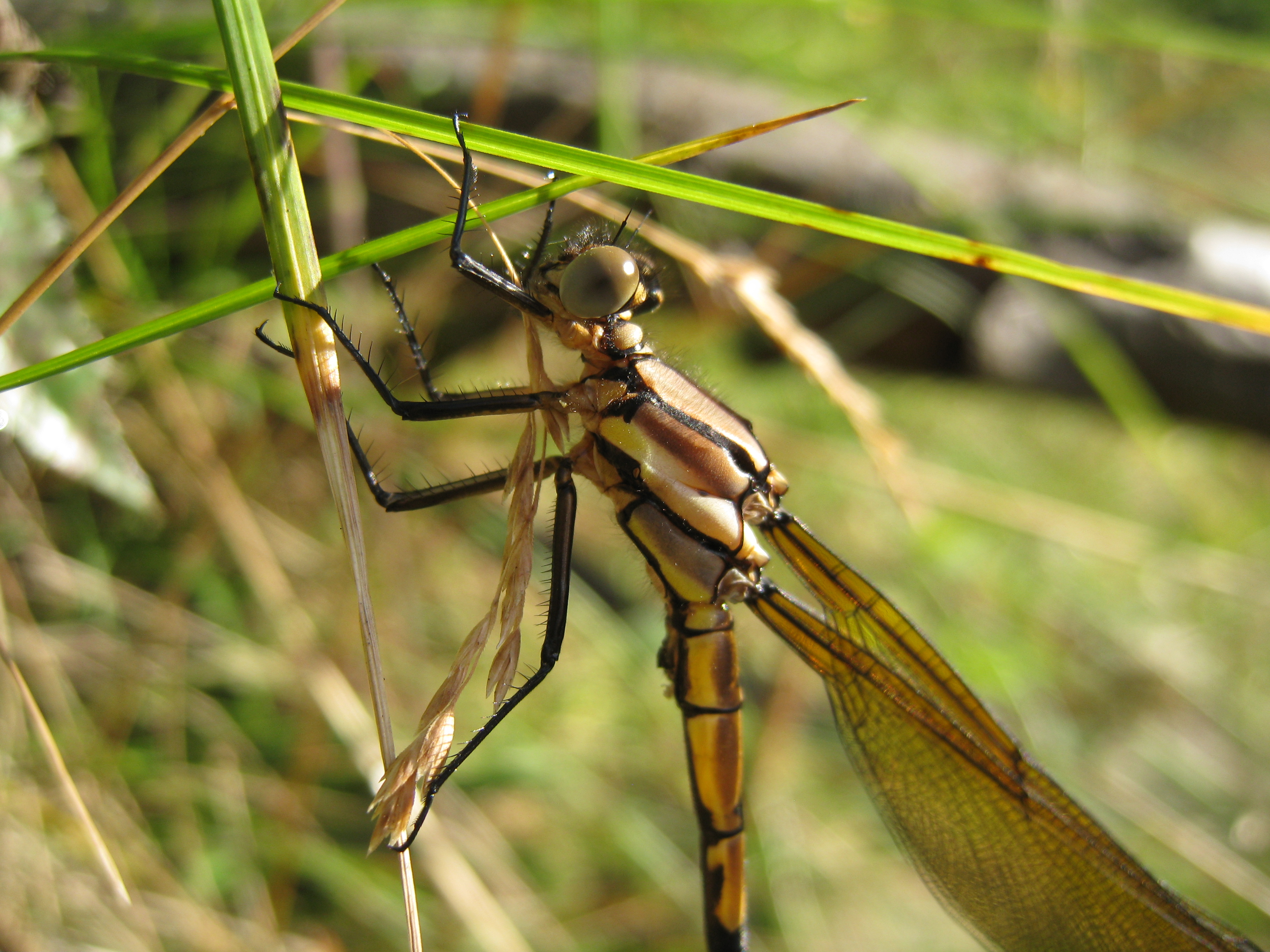
Male detail

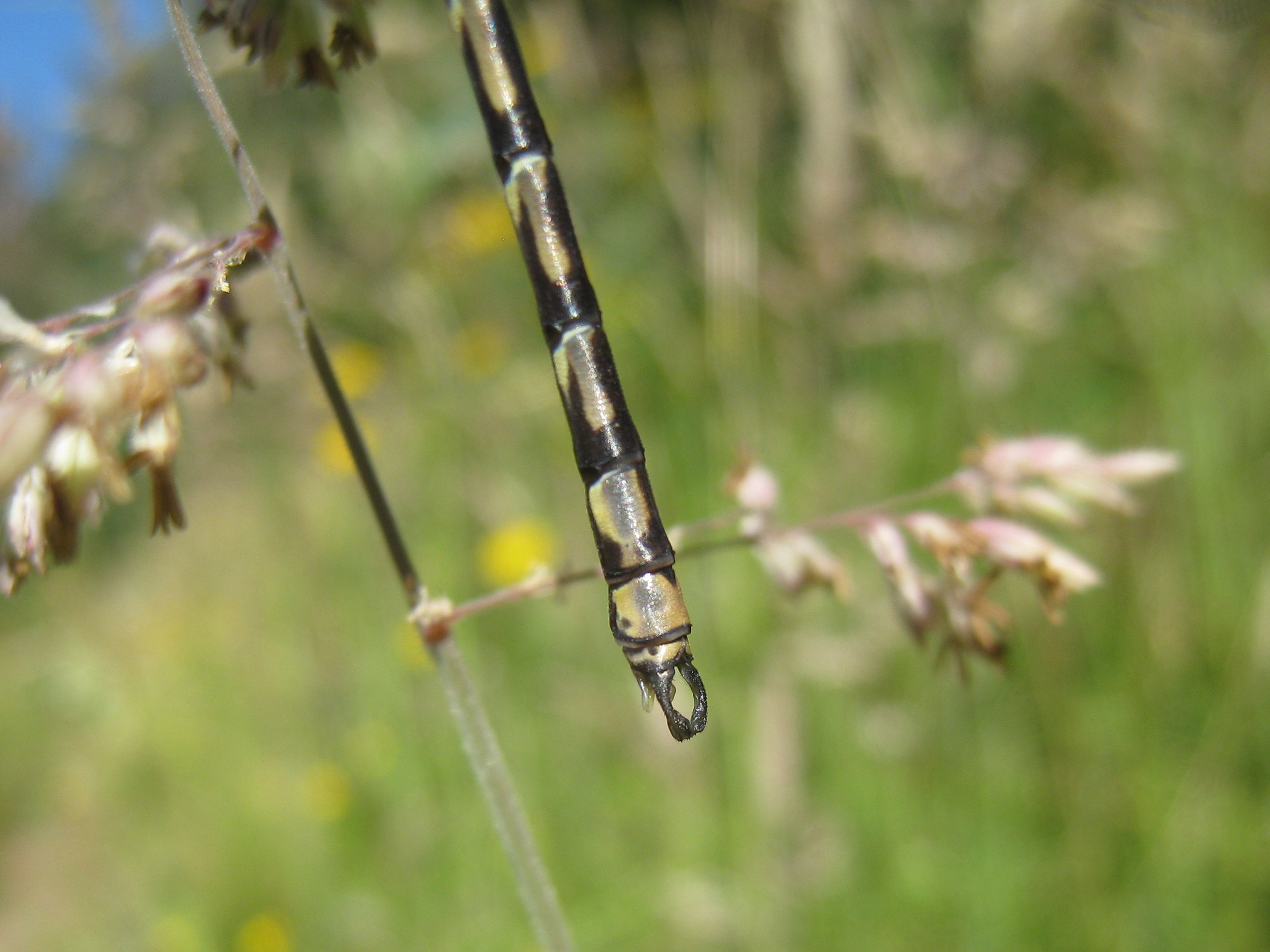
Detail of male tail

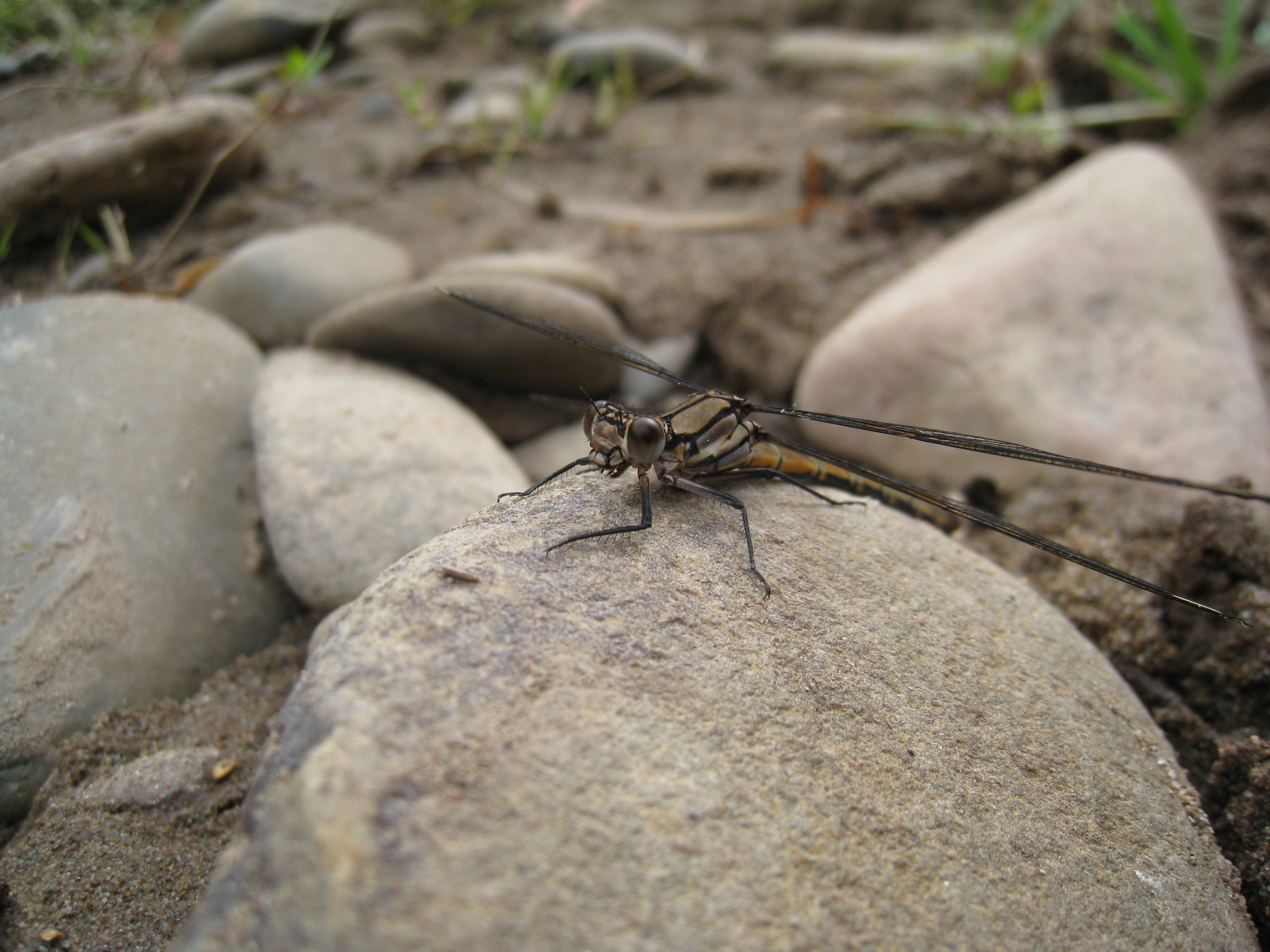
Face on

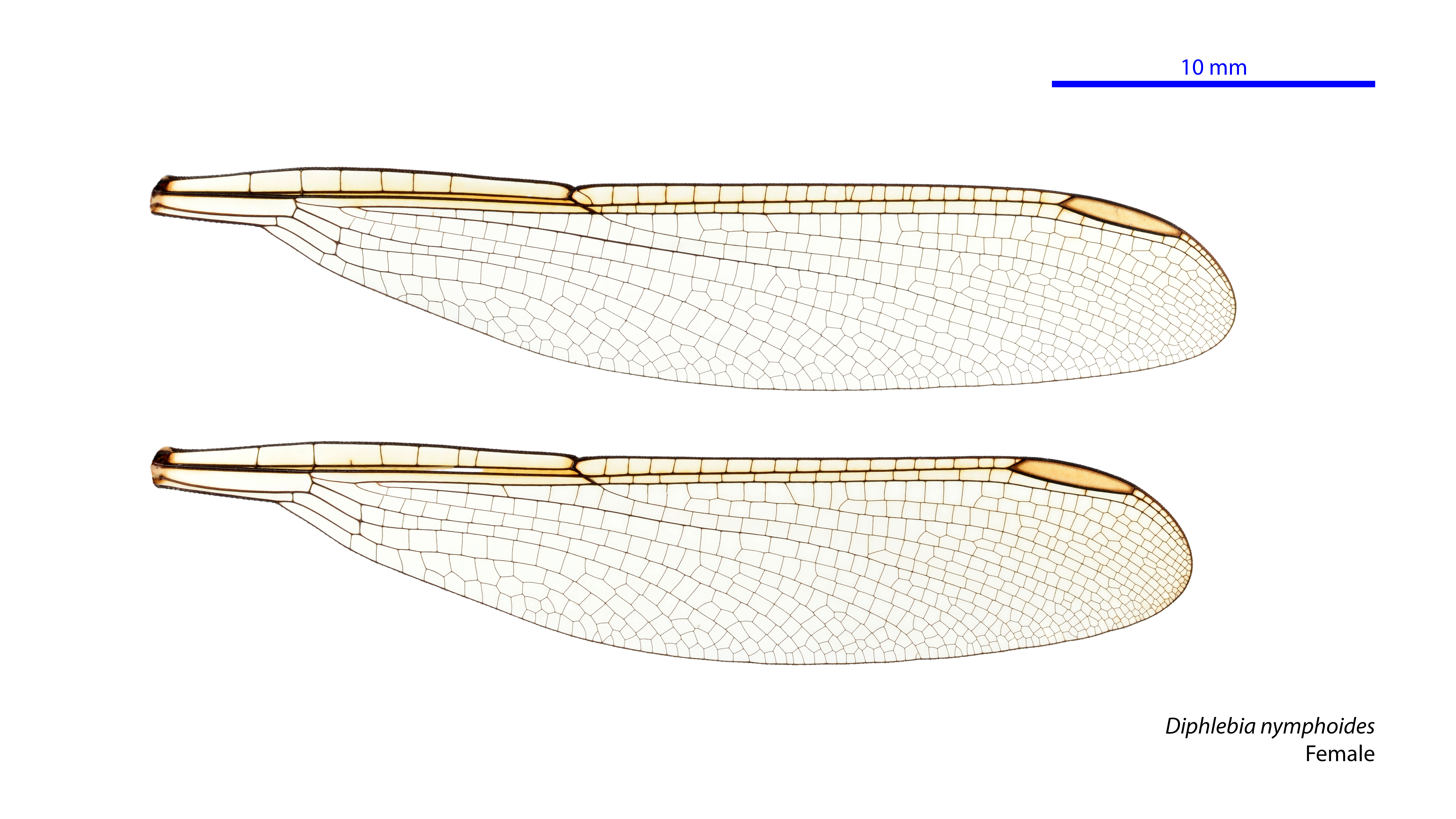
Female wings

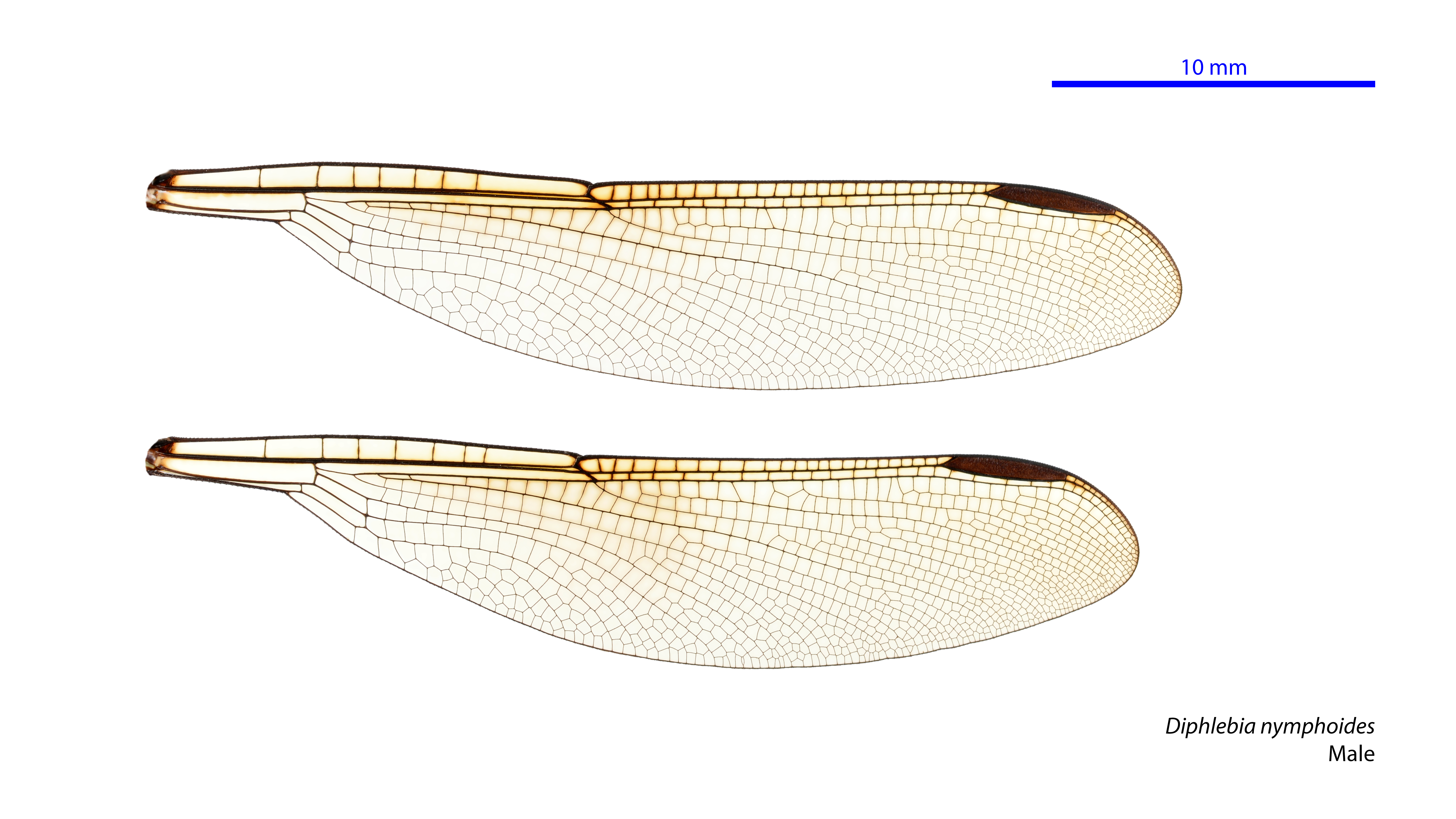
Male wings

== See also ==
- List of Odonata species of Australia
