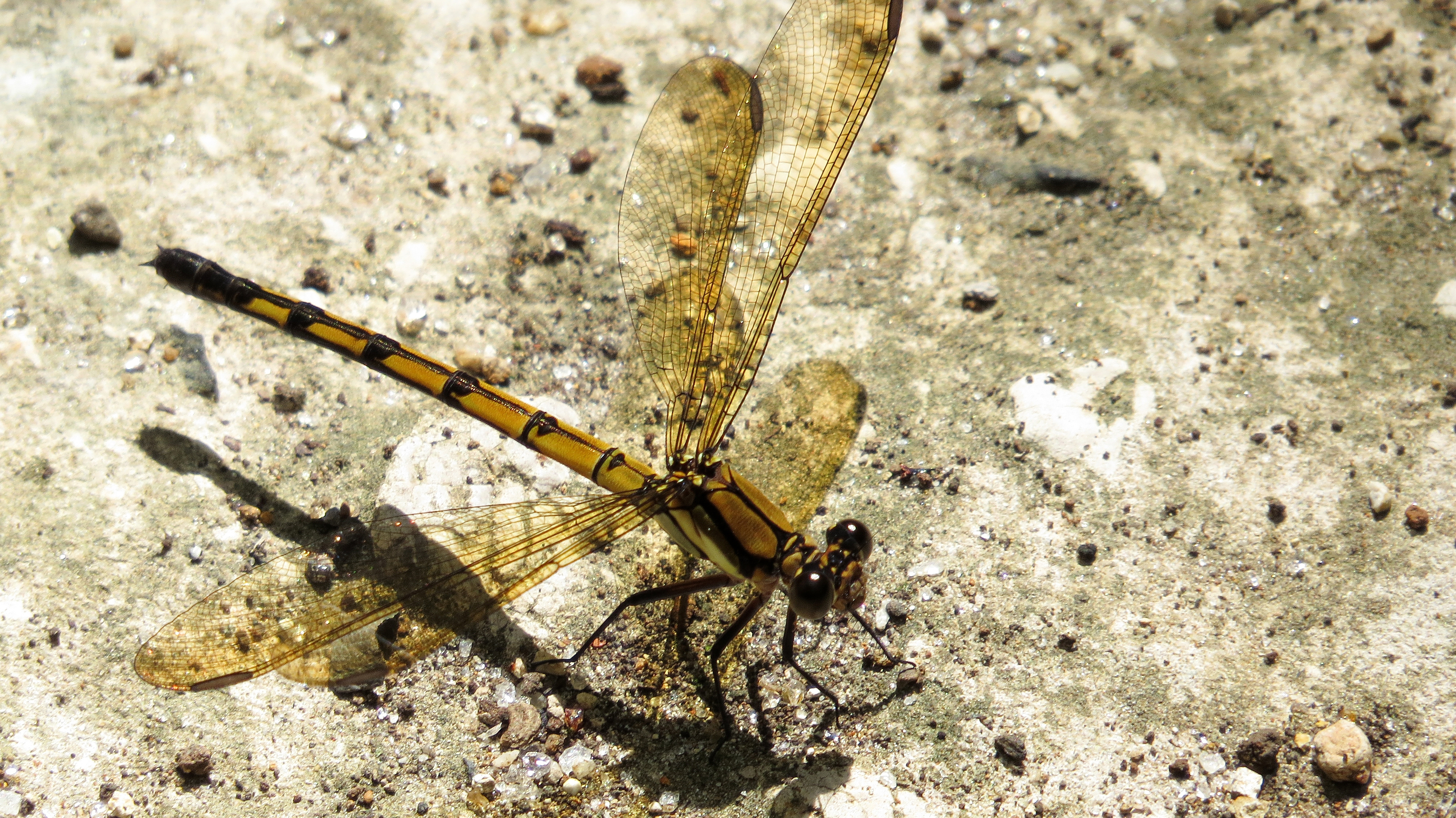
- Female
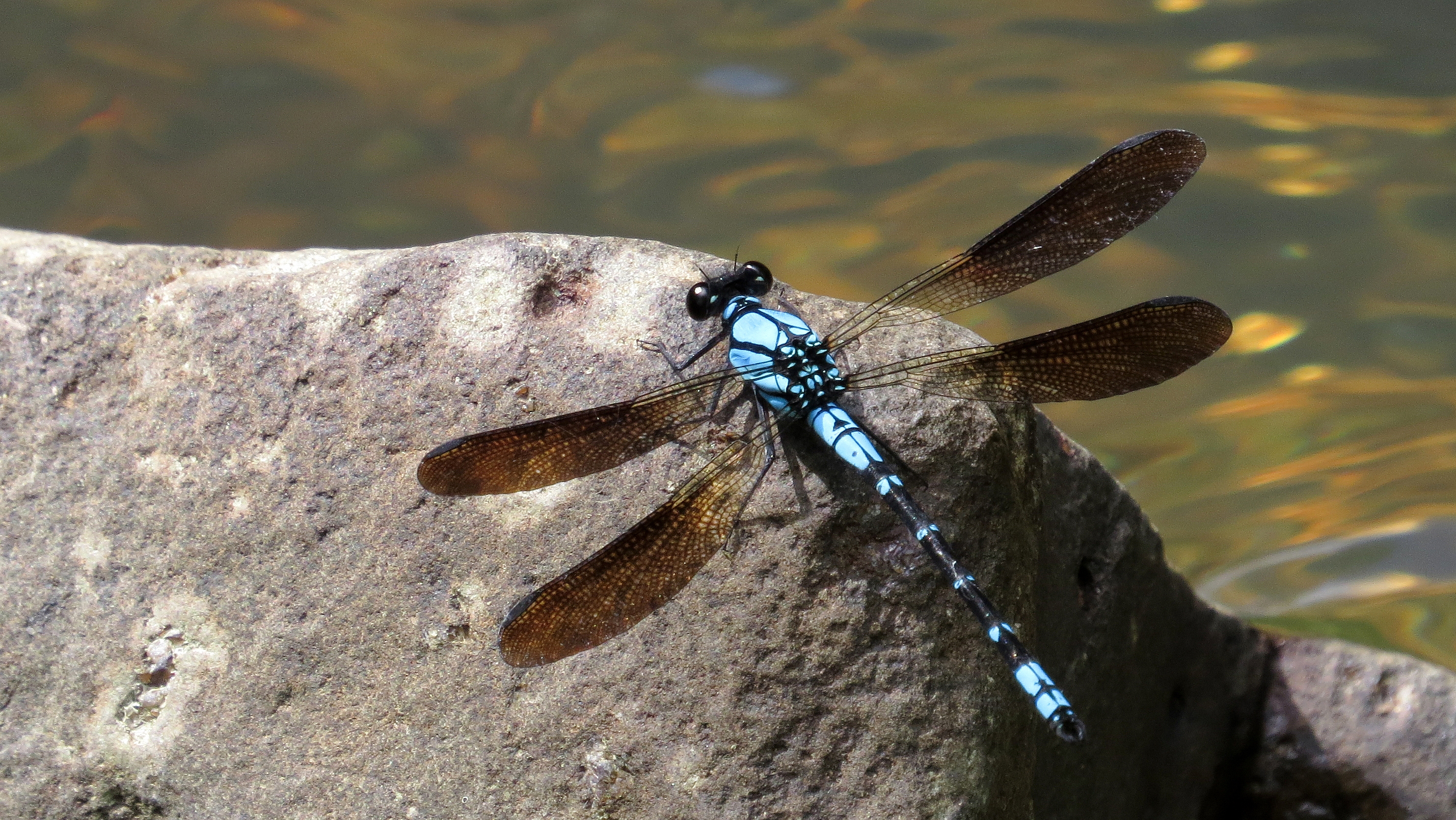
- Male

Conservation status
- Least Concern (IUCN 3.1)

Scientific classification
- Kingdom: Animalia
- Phylum: Arthropoda
- Clade: Pancrustacea
- Class: Insecta
- Order: Odonata
- Suborder: Zygoptera
- Family: Lestoideidae
- Genus: Diphlebia
- Species: D. coerulescens

Binomial name
- Diphlebia coerulescens Tillyard 1913

= Diphlebia coerulescens =

Sapphire rockmaster

Species of Australian damselfly

Diphlebia coerulescens, known as the sapphire rockmaster, is an Australian species of broad winged damselfly. It is one of a group known as the azure damselflies. It is found in Queensland and north-eastern New South Wales in eastern Australia, where it is found in fast-flowing streams and rivers.

English-born entomologist, Robin Tillyard described the sapphire rockmaster as a subspecies of the tropical rockmaster, Diphlebia euphoeoides in 1913, before reassessing it as a separate species on the basis of the distinct shape of the male anal appendage, as well as differences in size and colour of the adults.

The male sapphire rockmaster has a mostly bright blue and black body with dark wings. It can be distinguished from the tropical rockmaster by the larger size of two prominent blue markings at the base (front end) and underside of terga 4 to 6. Its upperside abdomen of its otherwise black abdomen often has blue markings to the front ends of the terga. The wings are narrower than the tropical rockmaster, but wider than the other members of the genus, and are a smoky brown rather than black. The legs are mostly brownish black, but have some blue on the upper mid and hind femurs. The female sapphire rockmaster is predominantly brown and olive-green, and also has smoky-coloured wings. Its legs are dark brown with light brown upper segments of mid and hind femurs. The upperside of its abdomen is a dark olive-green, with a darker dorsal line prominently running down the midline, which widens into a roughly triangular pattern at the rear end of each segment (tergum).

== Etymology ==
The genus name Diphlebia is derived from the Greek δίς (dis, "twice" or "double") and φλέψ (phleps, "vein"), likely referring to distinctive wing venation.

The species name coerulescens is derived from the Latin caeruleus ("blue") and the suffix -escens ("becoming"), likely referring to the blue colouration of the abdomen.

== Gallery ==
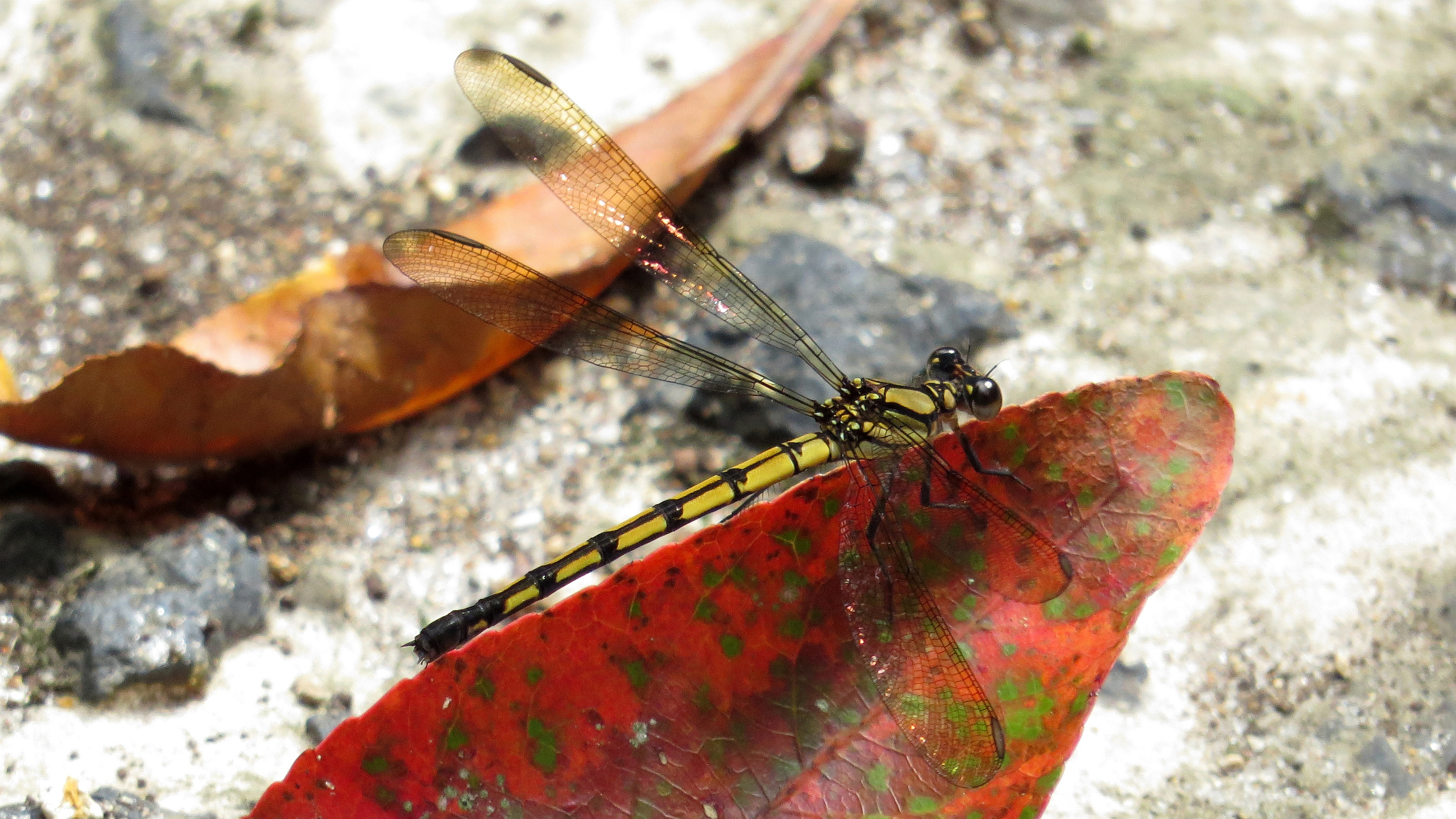
Female

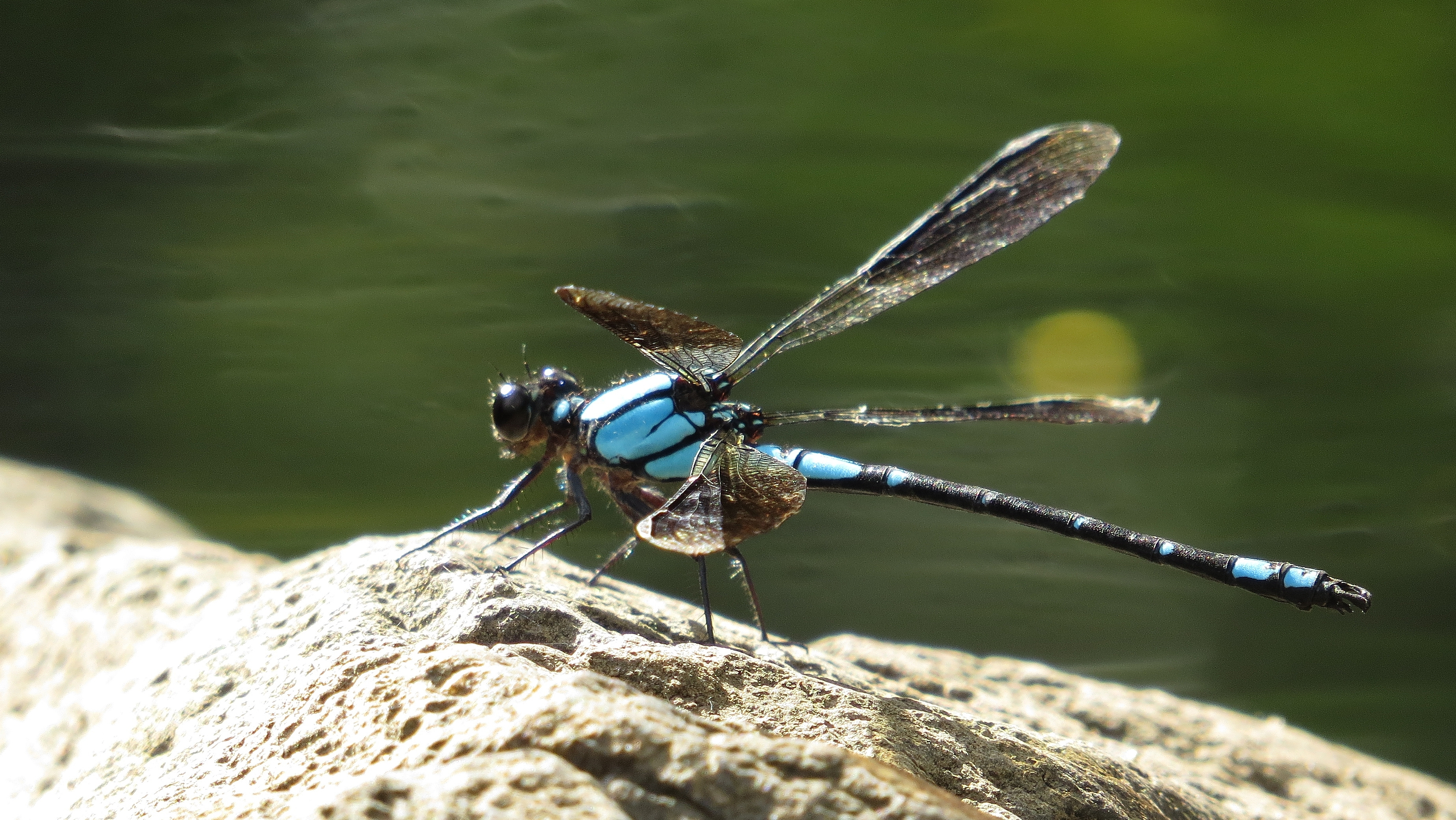
Male

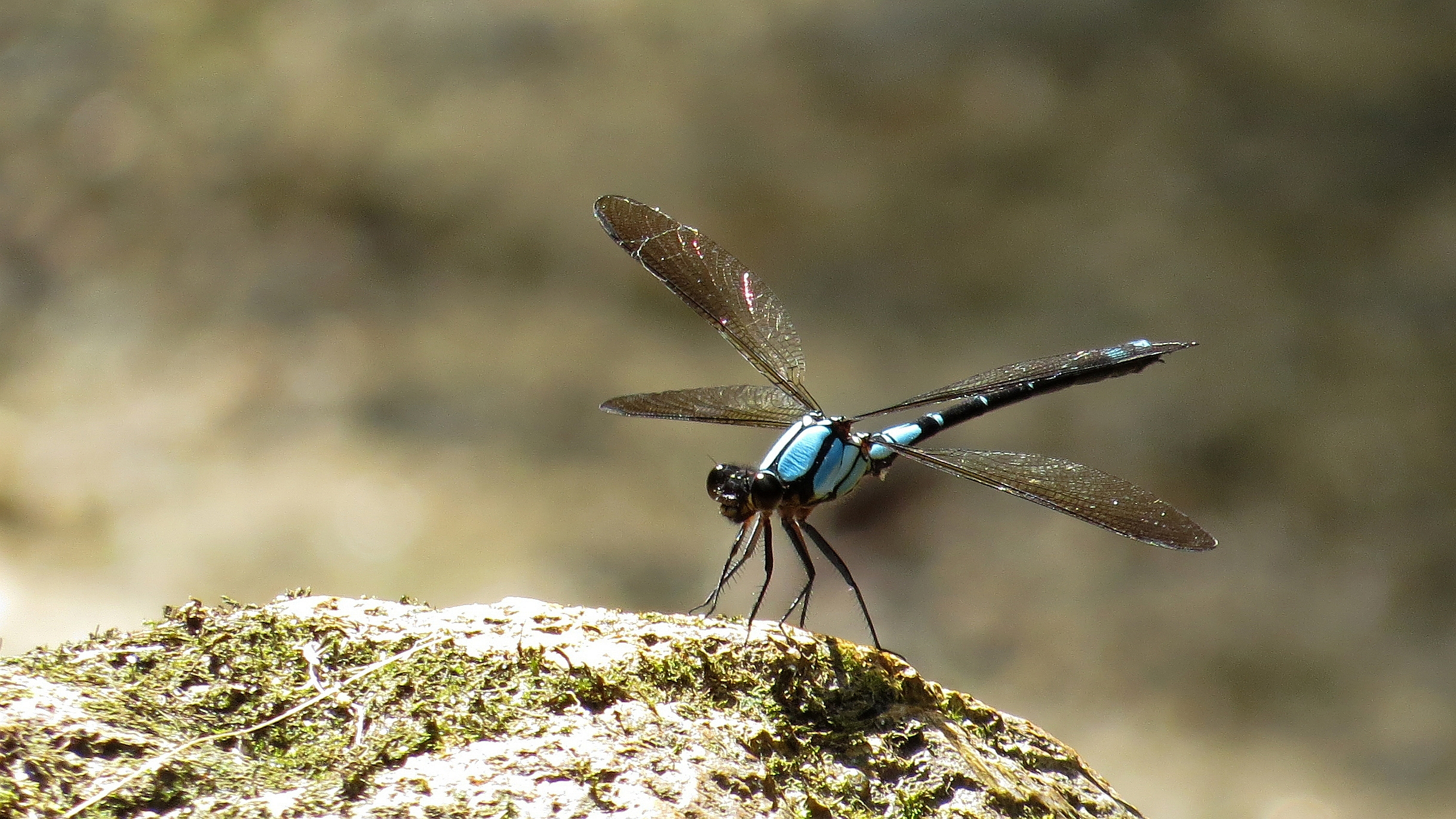
Male

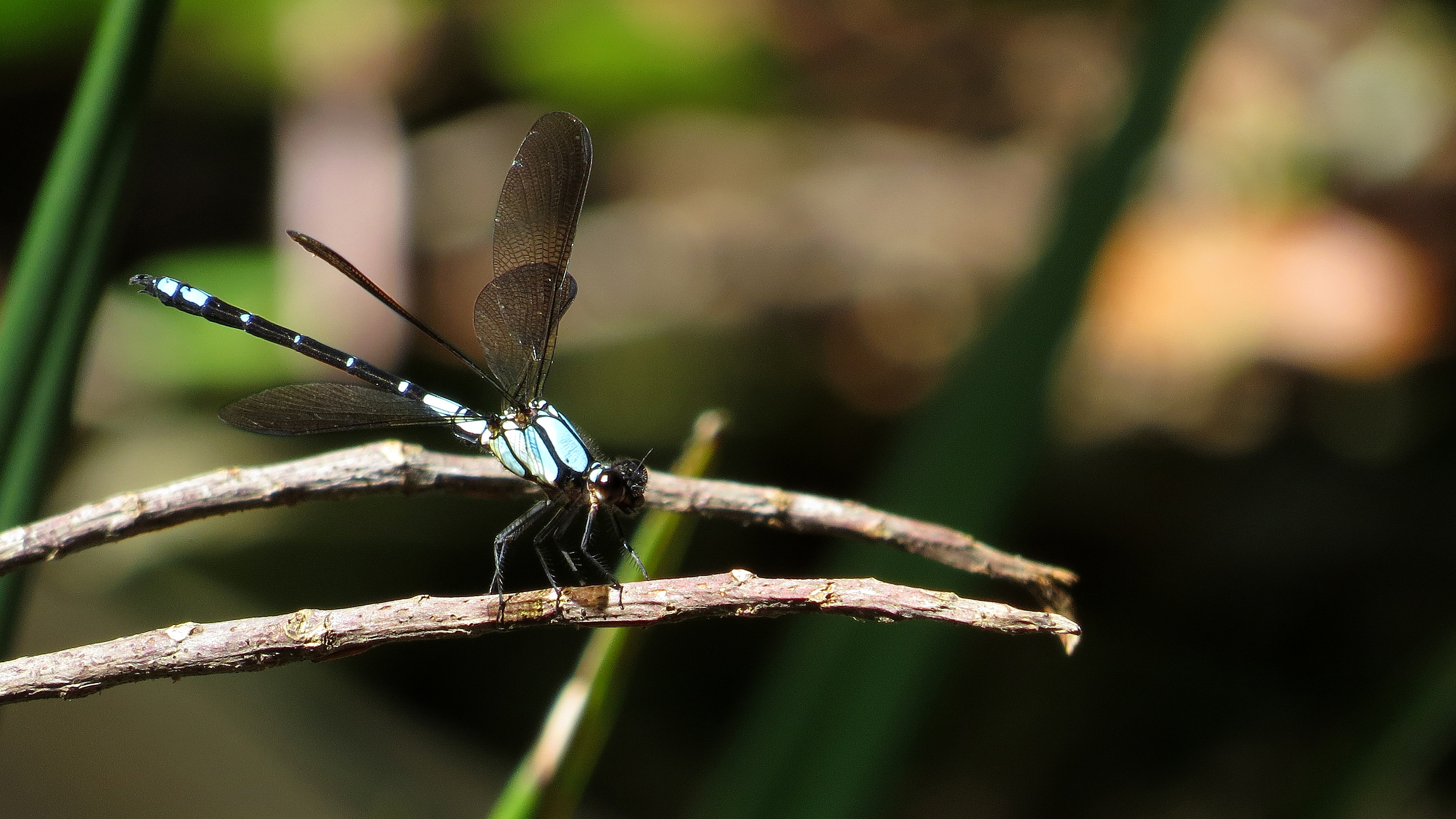
Wings up

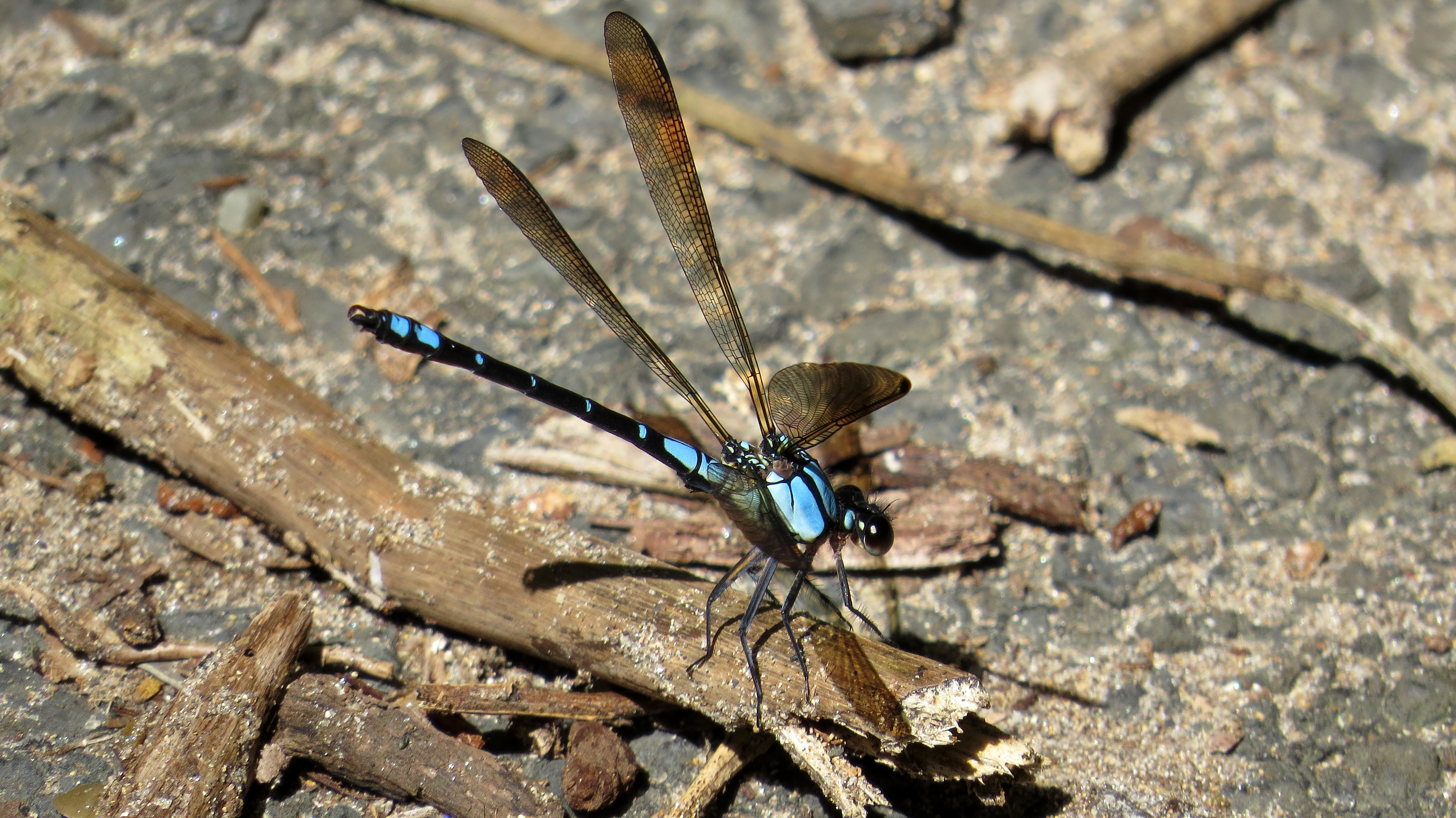
Bum up

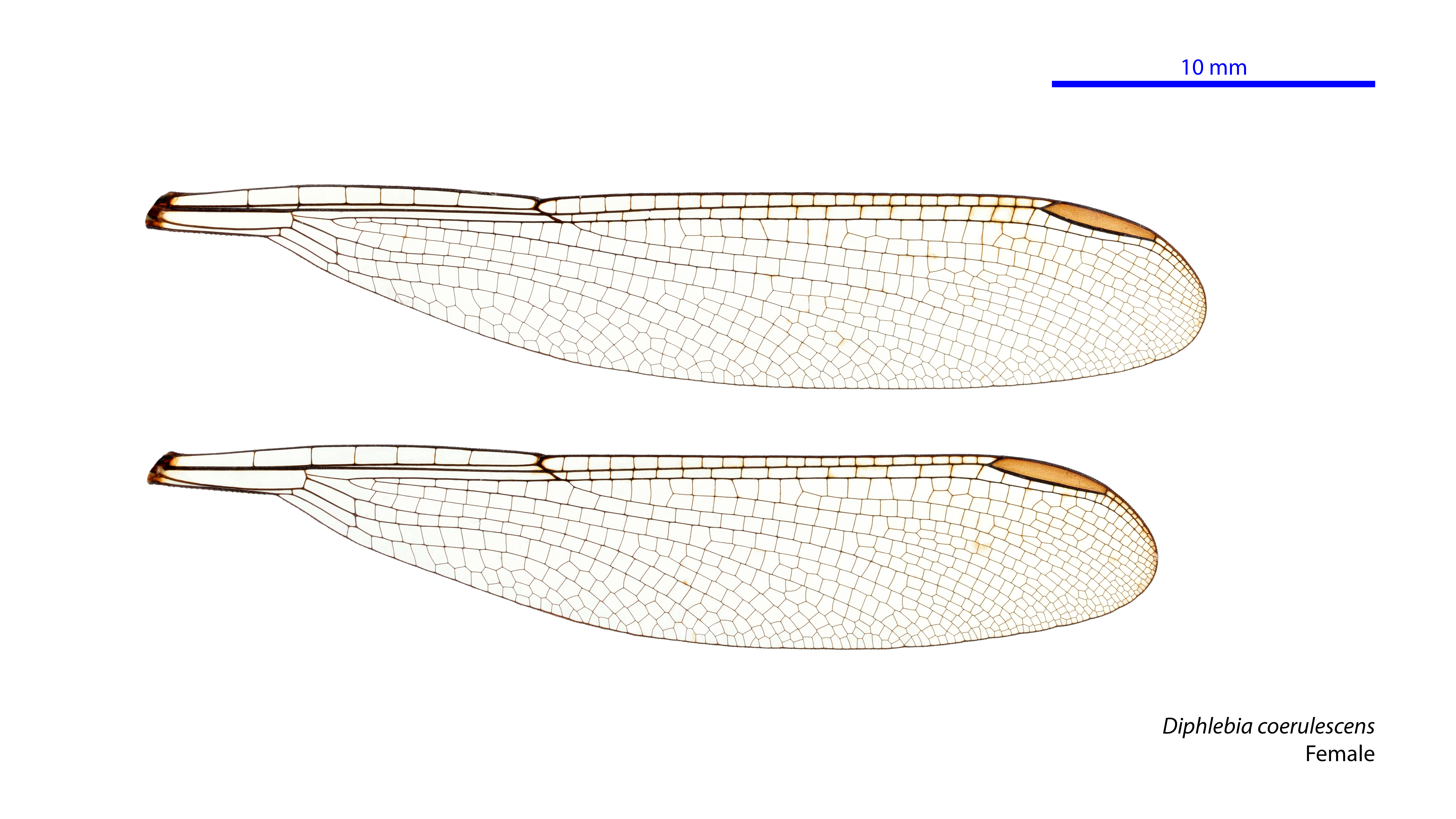
Female wings

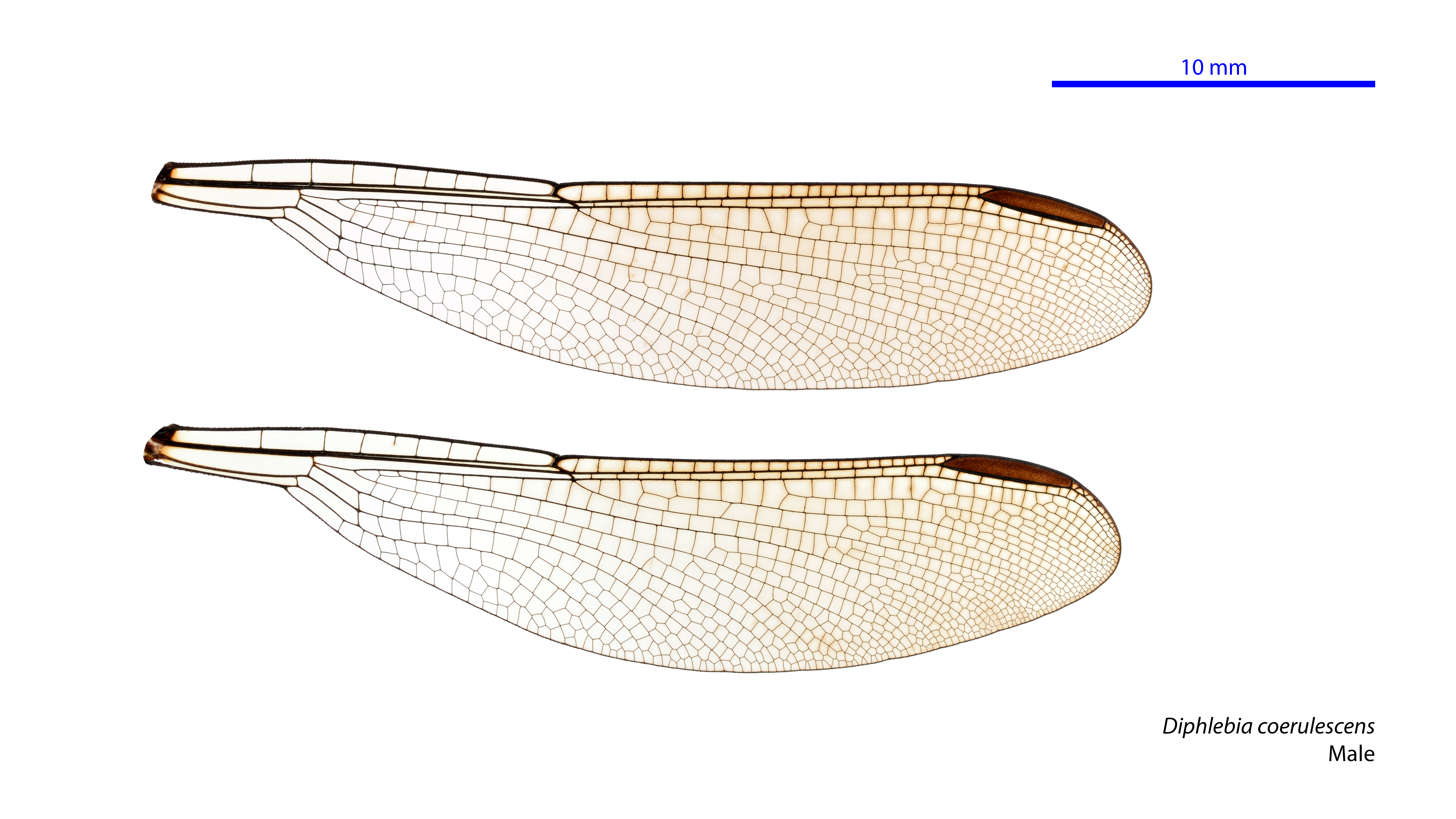
Male wings
