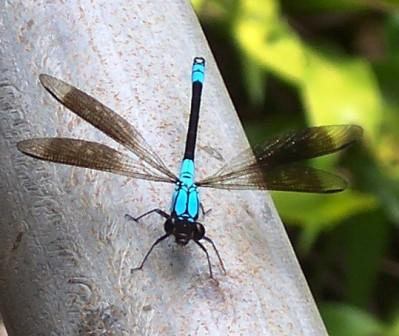
- Diphlebia euphoeoides

Scientific classification
- Kingdom: Animalia
- Phylum: Arthropoda
- Class: Insecta
- Order: Odonata
- Suborder: Zygoptera
- Superfamily: Calopterygoidea
- Family: Diphlebiidae Heymer, 1975

Synonyms
- Diphlebiidae Davies & Tobin, 1984

= Diphlebiidae =

Historical grouping of damselflies

Diphlebiidae is no longer recognised as a biological family. It was the name given to a small family of damselflies, the azure damselflies, with species in two genera: Diphlebia and Philoganga. Diphlebia is found in Australia and Philoganga is found in Southeast Asia. They are large and thick-bodied damselflies. They rest with their wings spread out. The Diphlebiidae were also known as Philogangidae.

Diphlebiidae is now split:

- The genus Diphlebia is now considered to belong to the family Lestoideidae.
- The genus Philoganga is now considered to belong to the family Philogangidae.
