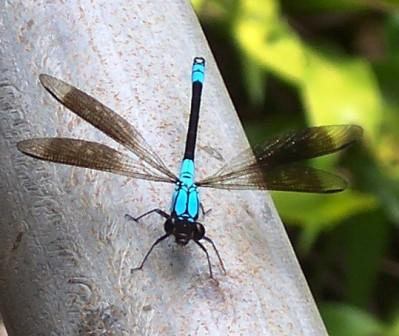
- Tropical rockmaster at Cairns, Australia
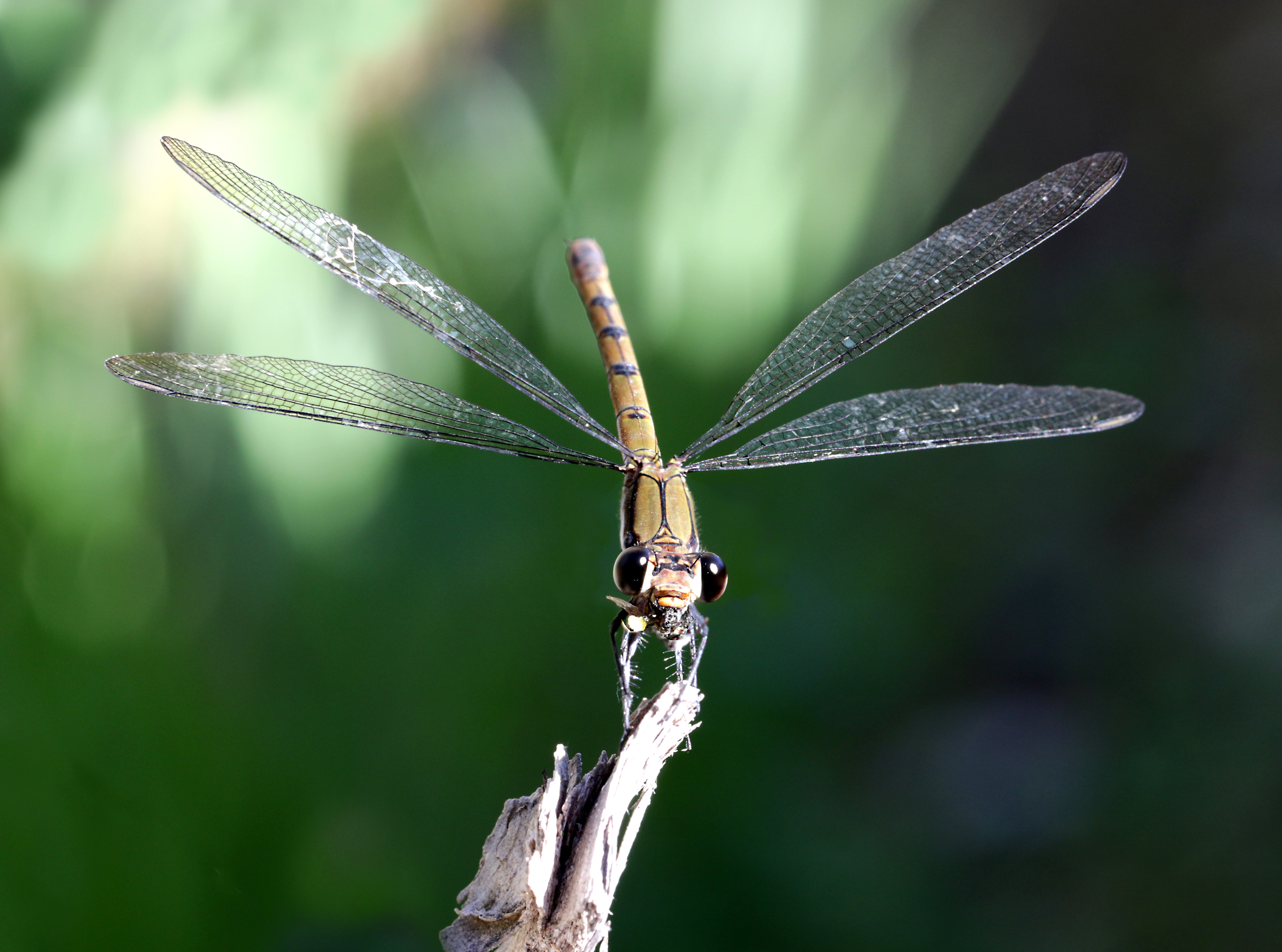
- Female at Atherton Tableland, Australia

Conservation status
- Least Concern (IUCN 3.1)

Scientific classification
- Kingdom: Animalia
- Phylum: Arthropoda
- Clade: Pancrustacea
- Class: Insecta
- Order: Odonata
- Suborder: Zygoptera
- Family: Lestoideidae
- Genus: Diphlebia
- Species: D. euphoeoides

Binomial name
- Diphlebia euphoeoides Tillyard 1907

Synonyms
- Diphlebia reinholdi Förster, 1910

= Diphlebia euphoeoides =

Tropical rockmaster

Species of damselfly

Diphlebia euphoeoides, sometimes spelled Diphlebia euphaeoides, known as the tropical rockmaster, is an Australian species of broad winged damselfly. It is one of a group known as the azure damselflies. It is found in Queensland (Australia) and Papua New Guinea. It typically occurs near lakes, waterfalls or streams at relatively low altitudes, and is occasionally seen near dry pools.

Unusually for damselflies, it is a relatively large insect with its wings outspread at rest. It is often confused with dragonflies, although like most damselflies, the form is not as robust as dragonflies, and the eyes do not meet as with most dragonflies. Larvae are wide and flat, with long saccoid gills to breathe underwater. The inner tooth of labial palps is elongated. The specific characters of the larvae are mid-ventral, distal width, basal width, and length of median lobe. Larval motor patterns were similar to larvae in the Coenagrionidae.

The male tropical rockmaster has a bright blue and black body with dark wings. It can be distinguished from the sapphire rockmaster (Diphlebia coerulescens) by the smaller size of blue markings at the base (front end) and underside of terga 4 to 6. Its abdomen is otherwise black. Its wings are the widest in the genus, and the hindwings are wider than the forewings. The legs are brownish black. The female tropical rockmaster is predominantly brown and yellow-green, and also has smoky-coloured wings.

The transformation from egg to adult is through an incomplete metamorphosis. Like the adult form, the nymph is also a predator. Eggs are laid underwater on moss and reeds around November. The nymphal phase lasts for approximately one year. Adults usually emerge in September and October. It is an uncommon species, though not considered under threat. It was described in 1907 by a young English-born entomologist, Robin Tillyard. He had collected the lectotype at Mervyn Creek in Queensland in January 1905. Friedrich Förster collected what is now classified as the same species from around Port Moresby in New Guinea in 1910 and named it Diphlebia reinholdi.

== Etymology ==
The genus name Diphlebia is derived from the Greek δίς (dis, "twice" or "double") and φλέψ (phleps, "vein"), likely referring to distinctive wing venation.

The species name euphoeoides is derived from the Greek εὐφωνία (euphōnia, "a pleasing sound") and the suffix -ώδης (-ōdēs, "resembling").

== Gallery ==
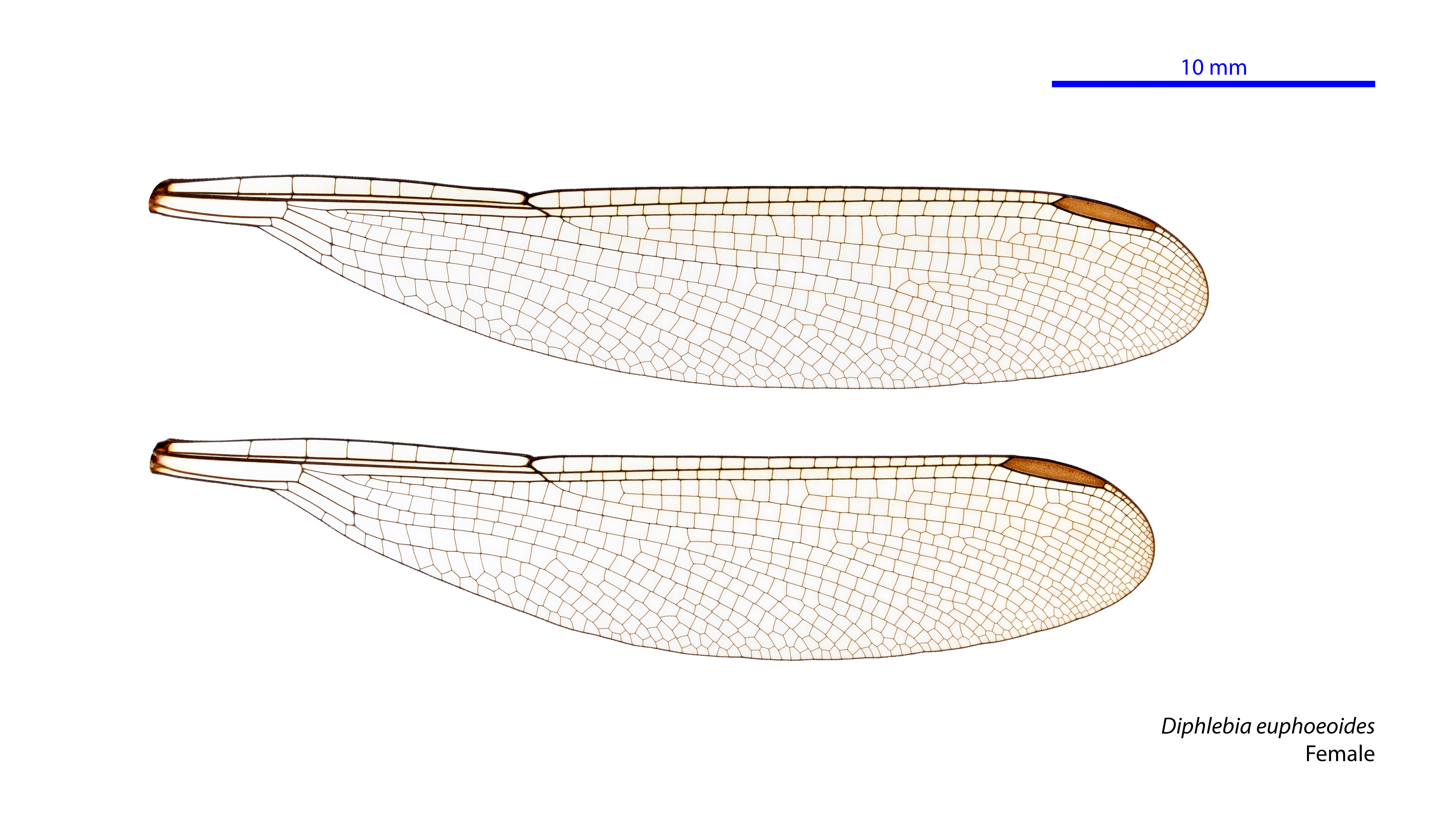
Female wings

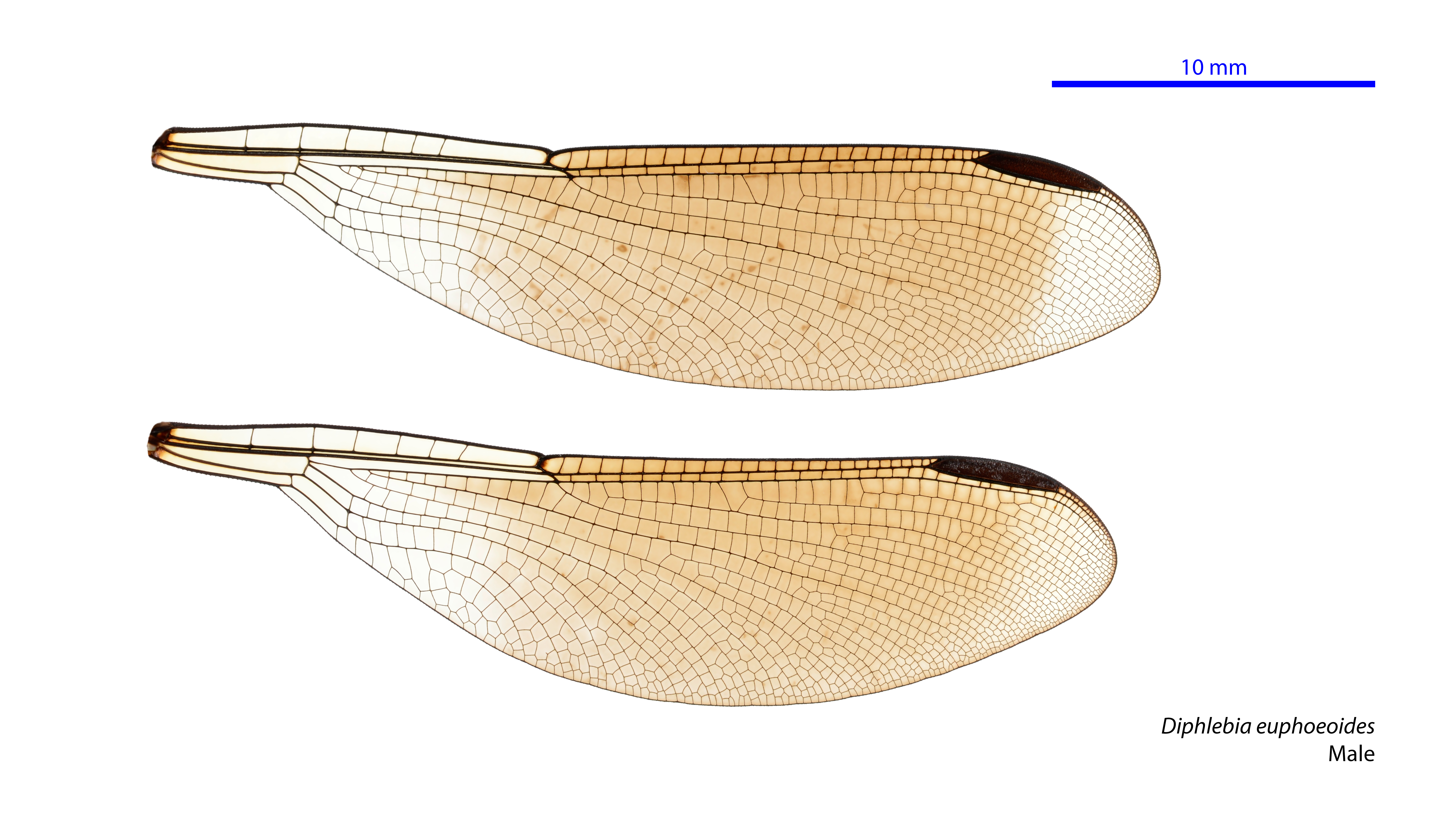
Male wings
