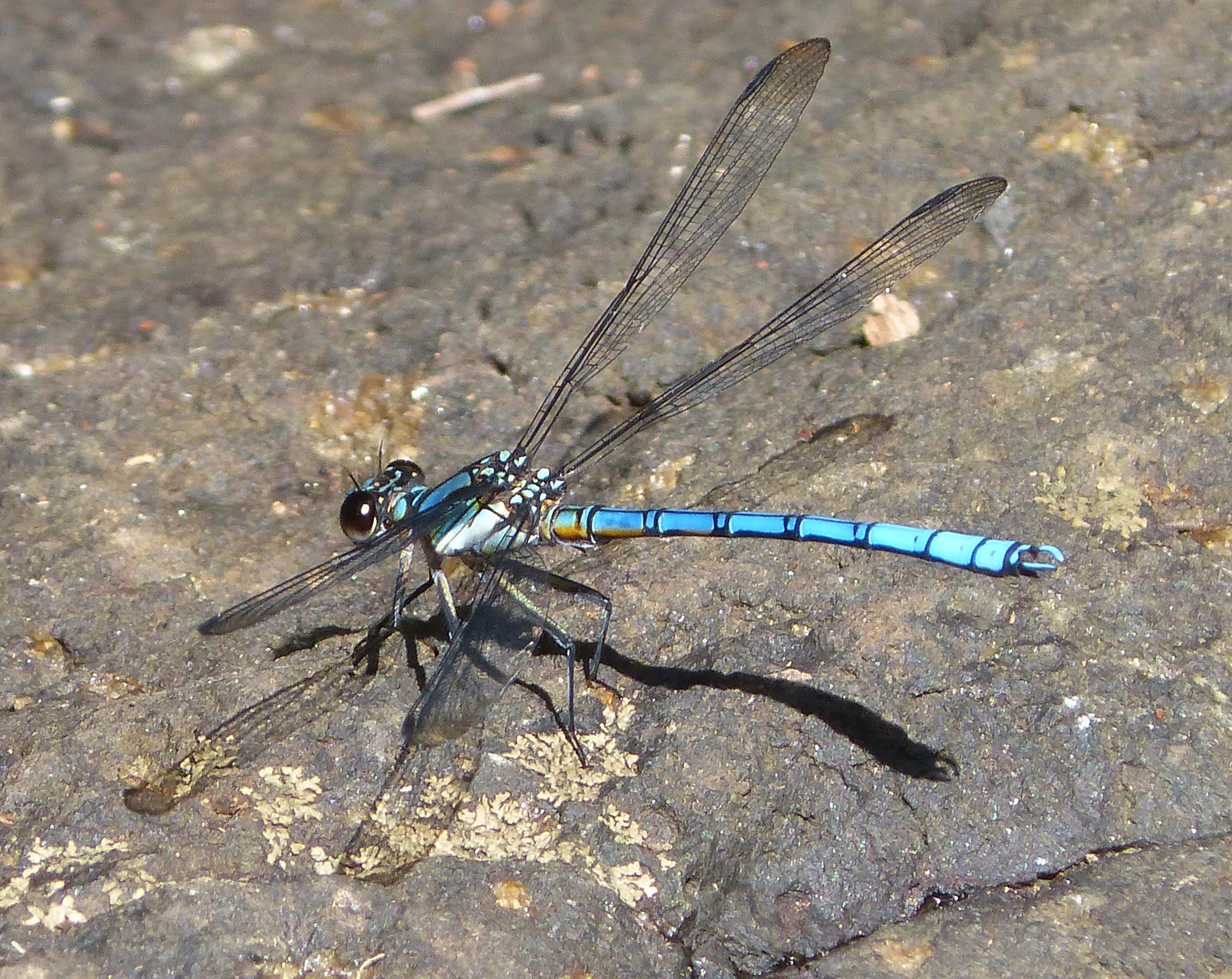
- Male Diphlebia lestoides

Conservation status
- Least Concern (IUCN 3.1)

Scientific classification
- Kingdom: Animalia
- Phylum: Arthropoda
- Clade: Pancrustacea
- Class: Insecta
- Order: Odonata
- Suborder: Zygoptera
- Family: Lestoideidae
- Genus: Diphlebia
- Species: D. lestoides

Binomial name
- Diphlebia lestoides (Selys, 1853)

Synonyms
- Amphiteryx lestoides Selys, 1853

= Diphlebia lestoides =

Whitewater rockmaster

Species of damselfly

Diphlebia lestoides is a species of Australian damselfly in the family Lestoideidae, commonly known as a whitewater rockmaster. It is endemic to south-eastern Australia, where it inhabits streams and rivers.

Diphlebia lestoides is a large, solid-looking damselfly; the male is a blue to grey colour with black markings, while the female has a more muted colouring. It sits with its white marked wings spread out.

== Etymology ==
The genus name Diphlebia is derived from the Greek δίς (dis, "twice" or "double") and φλέψ (phleps, "vein"), likely referring to distinctive wing venation.

The species name lestoides combines Lestes, a genus name derived from the Greek λῃστής (lēstēs, "robber"), with the suffix -ώδης (-ōdēs, "resembling"), referring to its resemblance to Lestes.

== Gallery ==
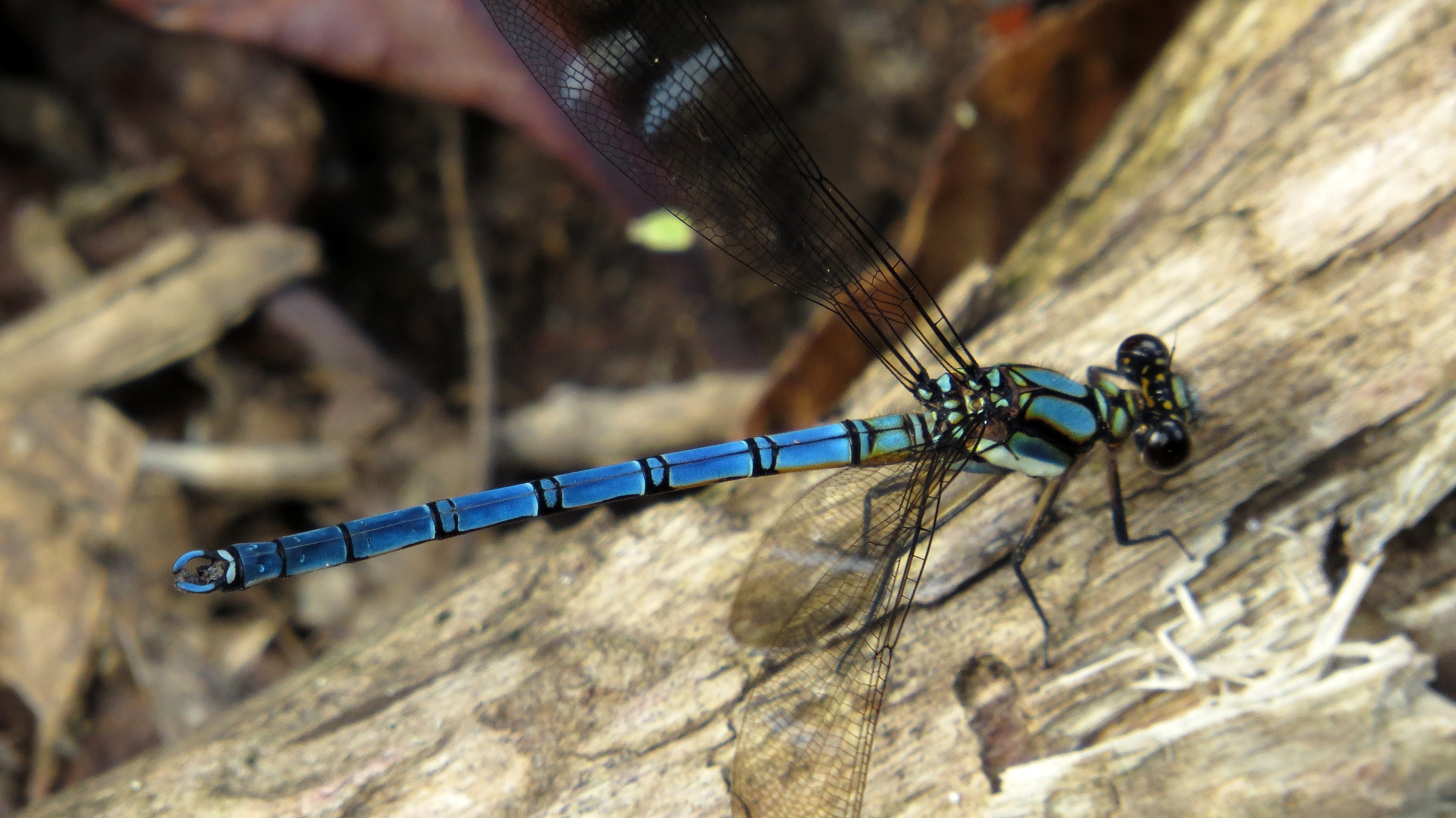
Male

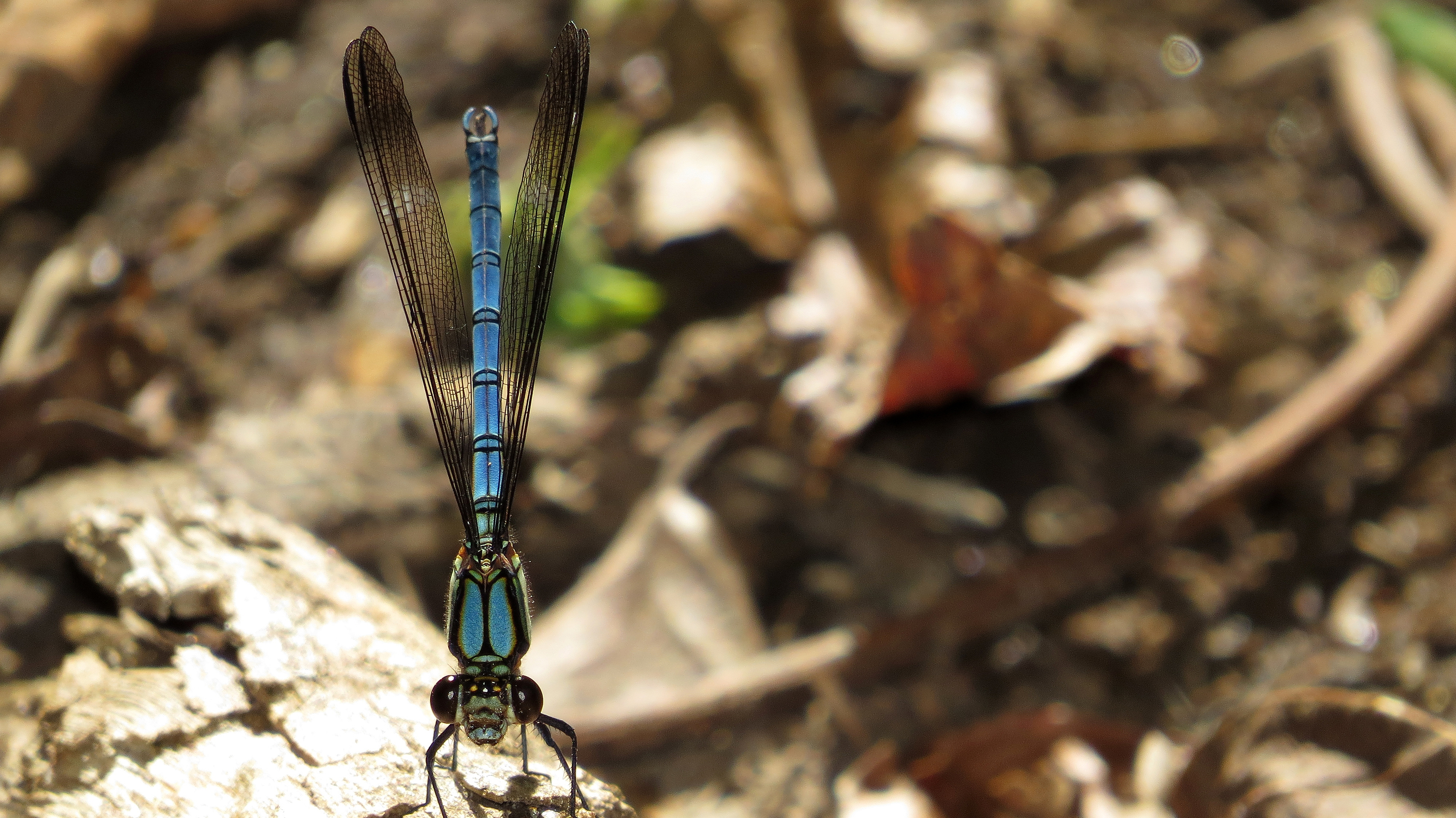
Male, face on

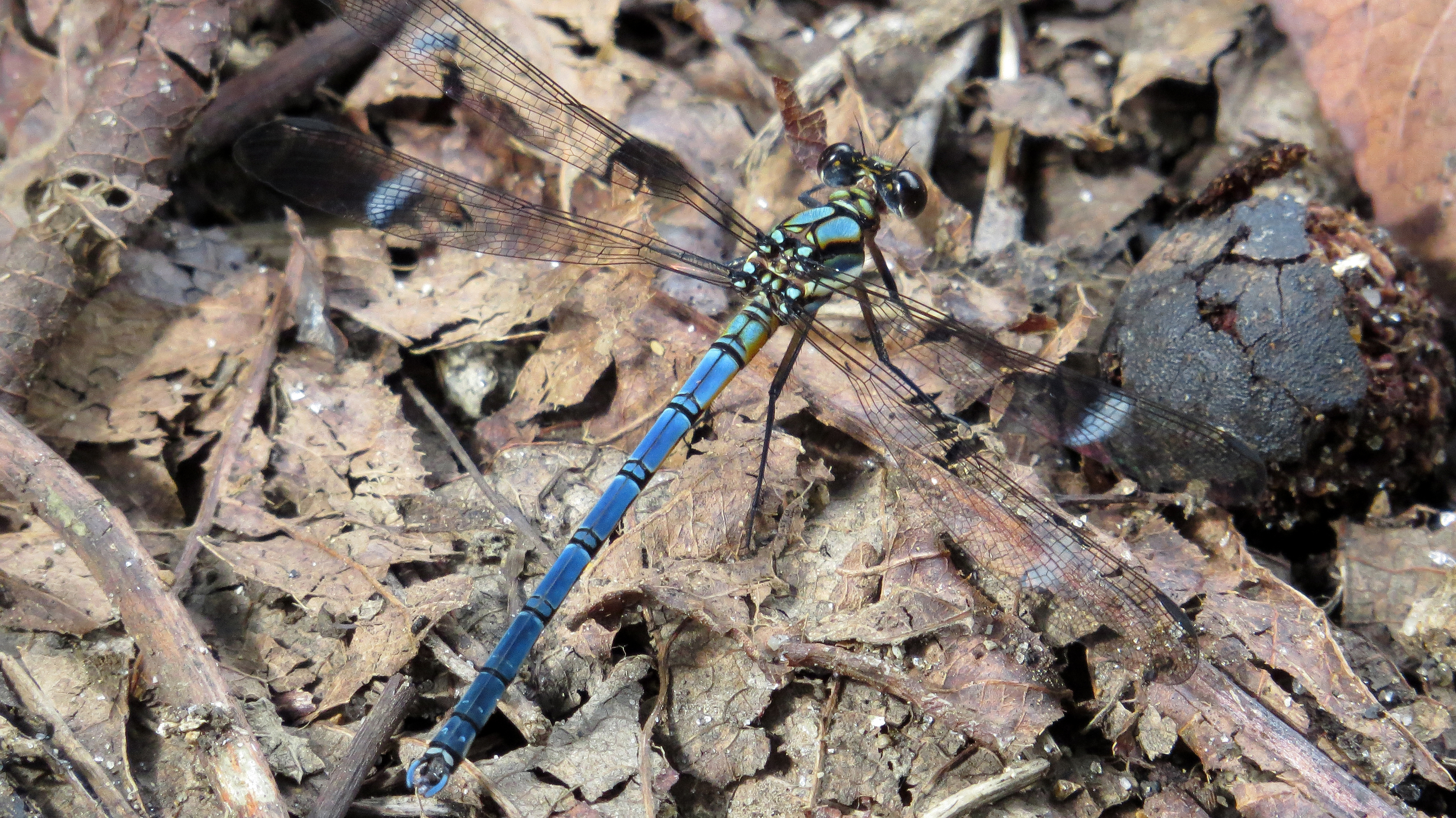
Note the white band in his wings

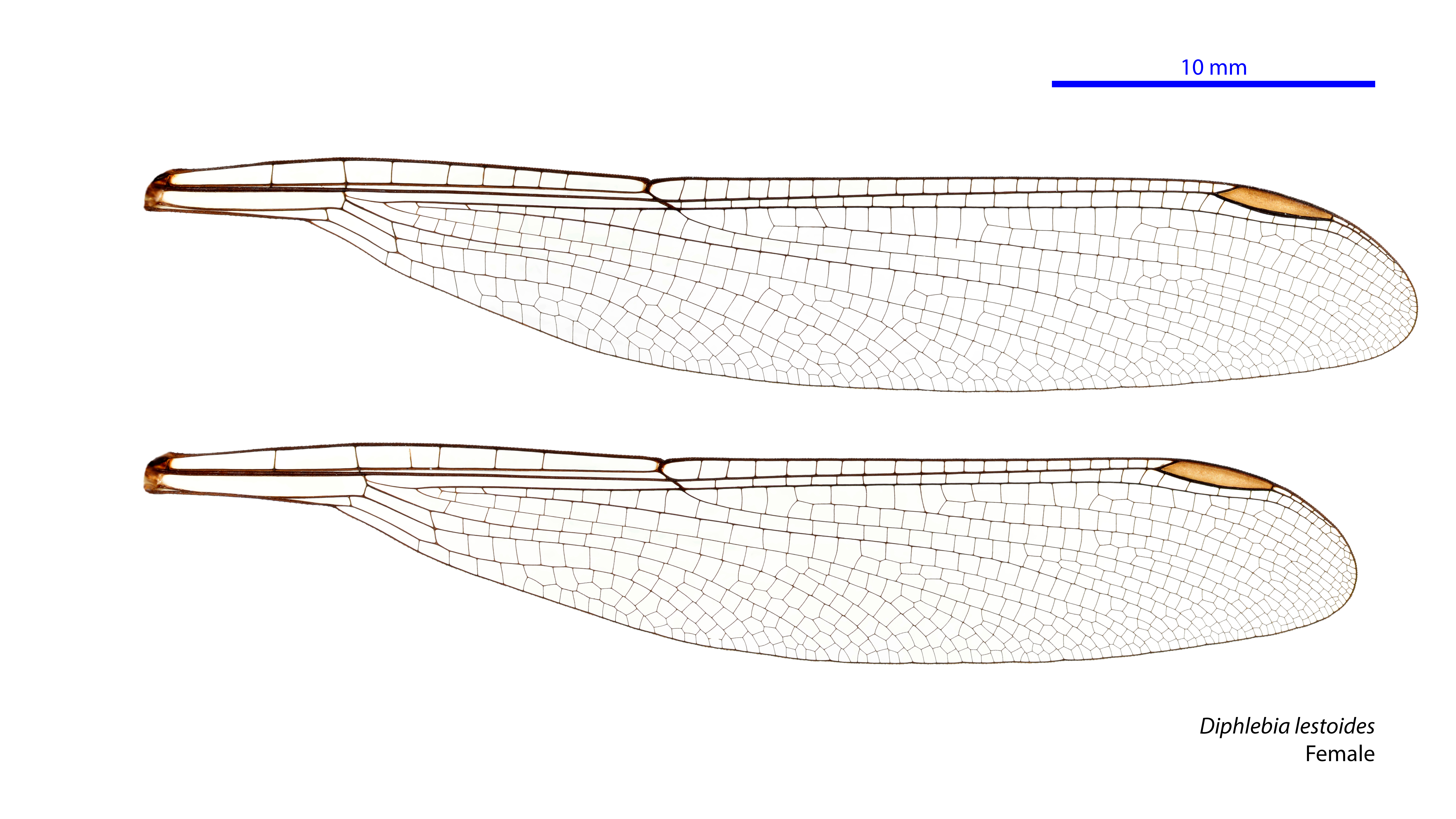
Female wings

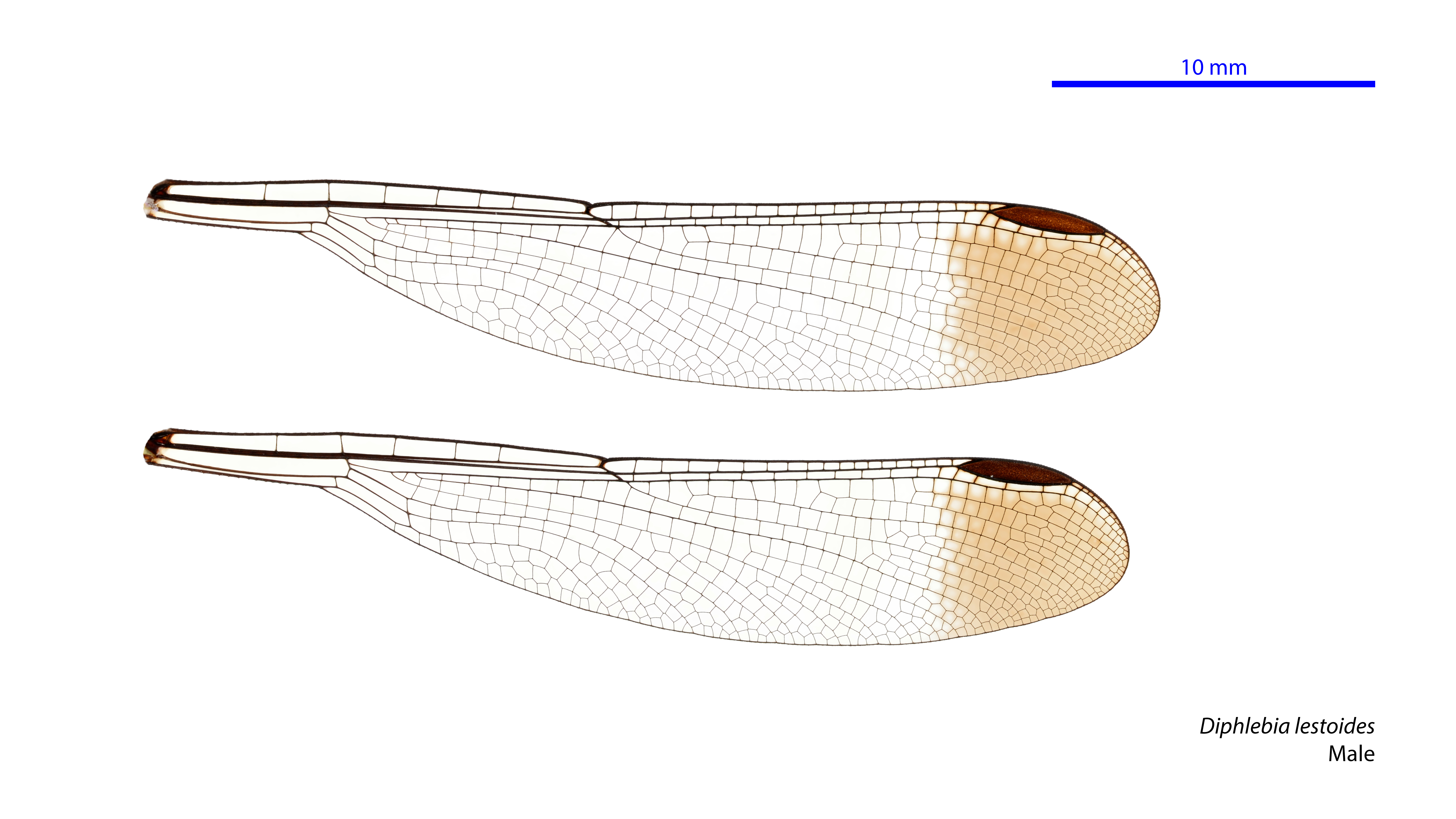
Male wings

== See also ==
- List of Odonata species of Australia
