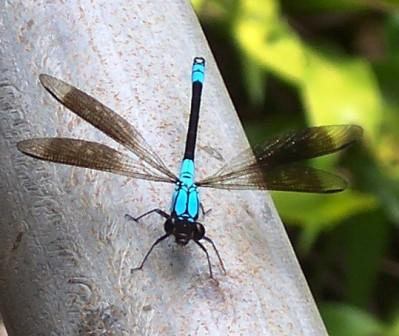
- Tropical rockmaster

Scientific classification
- Kingdom: Animalia
- Phylum: Arthropoda
- Clade: Pancrustacea
- Class: Insecta
- Order: Odonata
- Suborder: Zygoptera
- Family: Lestoideidae
- Subfamily: Diphlebiinae; Heymer, 1975
- Genus: Diphlebia; Selys, 1869

Synonyms
- Dineura Selys, 1859 (preoccupied)

= Diphlebia =

Rockmasters

Genus of damselflies

Diphlebia is a genus of damselflies in the family Lestoideidae. It is the only genus in the subfamily Diphlebiinae. Species of Diphlebia are commonly known as rockmasters.

The species in this genus are found in Eastern Australia, except for one species that can be found in New Guinea. The males are vividly patterned. They are blue or bluish green and black in colour. Their blue colour also gives them the name azure damselflies.These damselflies are very large and thick. They rest with their wings spread out. Their wings are usually blackish brown or have white markings. These damselflies have several present antenodal crossveins. The two basal crossveins extend across costal and subcostal spaces.

Diphlebia larvae are wide and flat. They have long saccoid gills enabling them to breathe underwater. The inner tooth of their labial palps is elongated. The specific characters of the larvae are mid-ventral, distal width, basal width, and length of median lobe.

== Taxonomic history ==
The genus was originally named Dineura by Selys in 1859, but this name was preoccupied by Dineura Dahlbom, 1835 (Hymenoptera). Selys therefore introduced the replacement name Diphlebia in 1869. The type species is Amphipteryx lestoides Selys, 1853, designated by monotypy.

In 1975, Heymer proposed the family Diphlebiidae to accommodate Diphlebia, separating it from Amphipterygidae. The genus is now placed in the family Lestoideidae, as the sole member of the subfamily Diphlebiinae, which retains Heymer's 1975 authorship.

== Species ==
Diphlebia includes five species that are found in eastern Australia and New Guinea. The following are the species:

- Diphlebia coerulescens Tillyard, 1913 - sapphire rockmaster
- Diphlebia euphoeoides Tillyard, 1907 - tropical rockmaster
- Diphlebia hybridoides Tillyard, 1912 - giant rockmaster
- Diphlebia lestoides (Selys, 1853) - whitewater rockmaster
- Diphlebia nymphoides Tillyard, 1912 - arrowhead rockmaster

== Etymology ==
The genus name Diphlebia is derived from the Greek δίς (dis, "twice" or "double") and φλέψ (phleps, "vein"), likely referring to distinctive wing venation.
