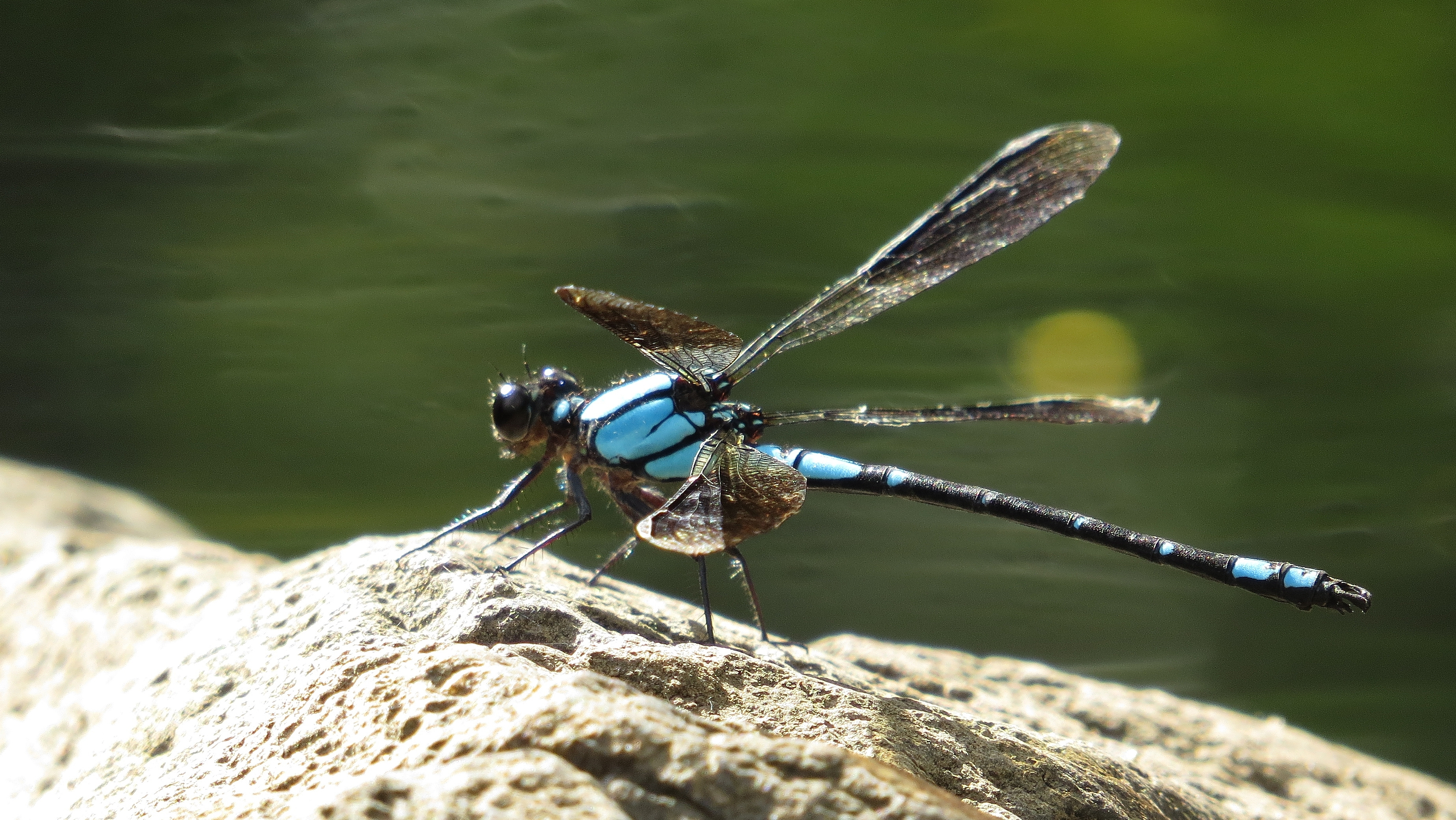
- Diphlebia coerulescens
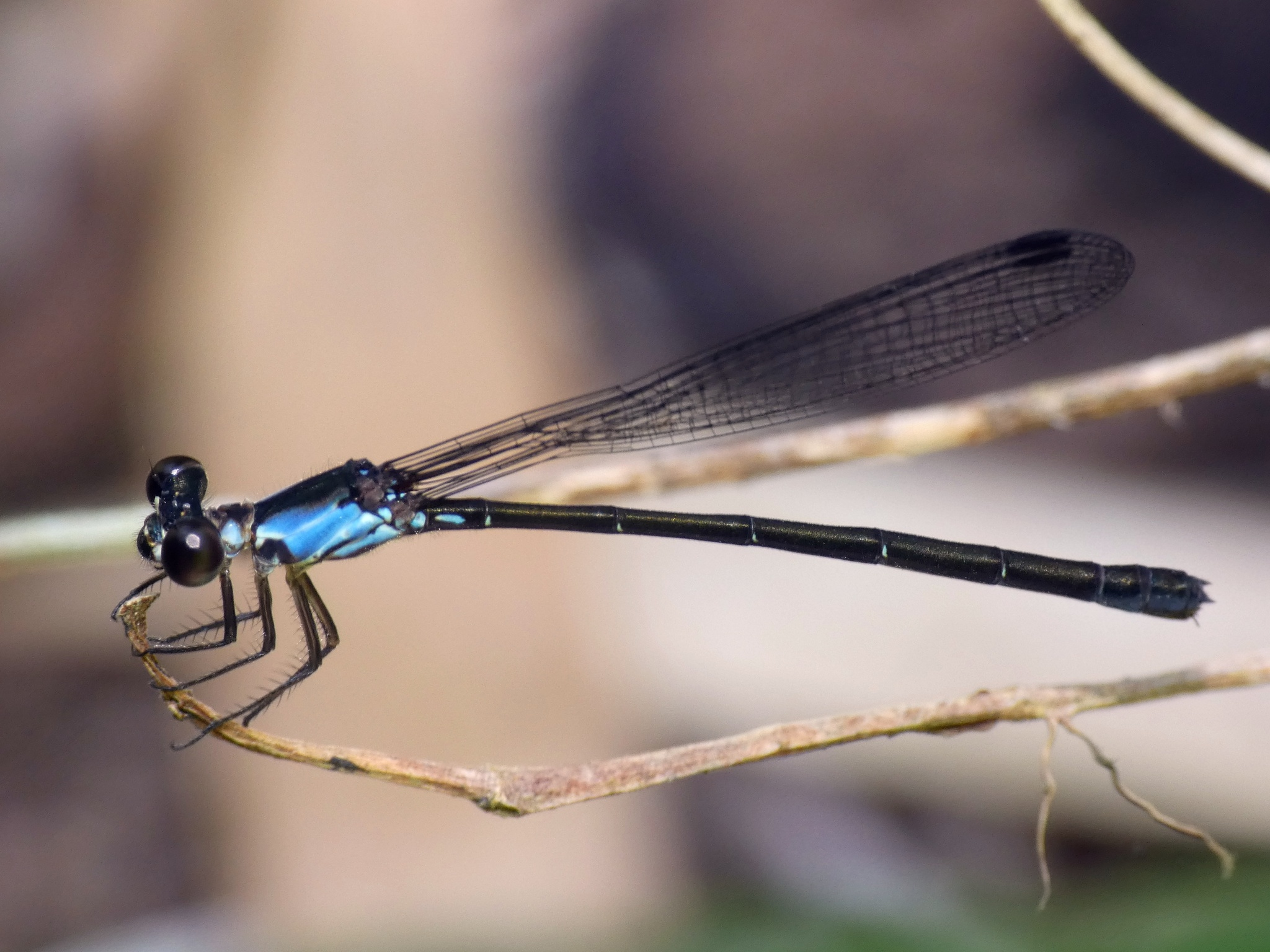
- Lestoidea barbarae

Scientific classification
- Kingdom: Animalia
- Phylum: Arthropoda
- Clade: Pancrustacea
- Class: Insecta
- Order: Odonata
- Suborder: Zygoptera
- Superfamily: Euphaeoidea
- Family: Lestoideidae; Munz, 1919

Type genus
- Lestoidea Tillyard, 1913

Genera
- Diphlebia Selys, 1869; Lestoidea Tillyard, 1913

= Lestoideidae =

Family of damselflies

Lestoideidae is a family of damselflies in the superfamily Euphaeoidea. The family contains the genera Diphlebia and Lestoidea, comprising nine described species. Members of Lestoideidae are found in Australia, New Guinea and Southeast Asia.

Members of the family are stream-dwelling damselflies. Although the broad-winged Diphlebia species differ markedly in appearance from the more slender Lestoidea species, modern studies indicate that they share a common ancestry and form a distinct evolutionary lineage.

Lestoideidae is the sister group of the predominantly Asian family Euphaeidae and represents one of the oldest lineages of living damselflies.

== Description ==
Members of Lestoideidae are stream-dwelling damselflies found in Australia, New Guinea and Southeast Asia.

The family contains two rather different genera. Species of Diphlebia are large, robust damselflies, often brightly marked with blue, green, black or white colouration and, in some species, conspicuous wing markings. They are commonly known as rockmasters and are associated with streams and rivers where the larvae live among rocks, cobbles and other submerged substrates.

Species of Lestoidea are medium-sized to large damselflies with dark brown or black bodies marked with dull orange, greenish or bluish colouration. They are confined to north-eastern Australia, where they inhabit rainforest streams. Unlike Diphlebia, they have very elongate pterostigmata and a greatly reduced anal vein, features that contributed to their recognition as a distinct lineage.

Although the two genera differ considerably in appearance, similarities in larval morphology and wing venation indicate a close evolutionary relationship.

== Taxonomic history ==
Tillyard established the genus Lestoidea in 1913 and regarded it as sufficiently distinctive to warrant a separate legion within the damselflies. Munz (1919) subsequently recognised this lineage as the subfamily Lestoideinae.

For much of the twentieth century, Lestoidea and Diphlebia were treated as unrelated lineages. In a study of pterostigma morphology, Heymer (1975) argued that Diphlebia differed sufficiently from Amphipterygidae to justify recognition of a separate family, Diphlebiidae.

Novelo-Gutiérrez (1995) later proposed that the apparently dissimilar genera Diphlebia and Lestoidea shared important larval and venational characters and should be classified together. Because Lestoideidae Munz, 1919 predates Diphlebiidae Heymer, 1975, the older name has priority.

Subsequent molecular studies confirmed the close relationship of the two genera and identified them as the sister group of Euphaeidae. Modern classifications therefore place both genera within Lestoideidae.

== Genera ==
The following genera are currently placed in Lestoideidae:

- Diphlebia Selys, 1869
- Lestoidea Tillyard, 1913

Note: It is important to distinguish the genus Lestoidea from the superfamily Lestoidea. They have the same spelling, but the superfamily is based on the genus Lestes.

== Etymology ==
The family name Lestoideidae is derived from the type genus Lestoidea, with the standard zoological suffix -idae used for animal families. The genus name Lestoidea is derived from Lestes and the Greek suffix -οειδής (oeidēs, "resembling" or "having the form of"), indicating resemblance to that genus.
