= Miocora =

Scientific classification
- Kingdom: Animalia
- Phylum: Arthropoda
- Clade: Pancrustacea
- Class: Insecta
- Order: Odonata
- Suborder: Zygoptera
- Family: Polythoridae
- Genus: Miocora; Calvert, 1917

Genus of damselflies

Miocora is a genus of damselflies in the family Polythoridae. Species of Miocora occur in Central and South America, where they inhabit forest streams.

== Description ==
Miocora species are medium-sized damselflies with broad wings and relatively sparse wing venation compared with the closely related genus Cora. The wings are generally clear, although the hindwings bear a dark apical patch. Adults are dark in colour with pale blue or green markings.

== Taxonomic history ==
The genus was established by Calvert in 1917 for Miocora peraltica, collected in Costa Rica. Calvert regarded the genus as closely related to Cora but distinguished it by its reduced wing venation, including the simplified branching of several veins and fewer rows of cells near the trailing edge of the wing. He subsequently recognised it as a distinct genus within Selys' "Legion Thore".

== Species ==
The following species are currently placed in Miocora:

- Miocora aurea (Ris, 1918)
- Miocora chirripa (Calvert, 1907)
- Miocora dualis (McLachlan, 1878)
- Miocora lugubris (Navás, 1934)
- Miocora notoxantha (Ris, 1918)
- Miocora obscura (Ris, 1918)
- Miocora pellucida Kennedy, 1940
- Miocora peraltica Calvert, 1917
- Miocora semiopaca (Selys, 1878)
- Miocora skinneri (Calvert, 1907)

== Etymology ==
The genus name Miocora is derived from the Greek μείων (meiōn, "less") and the related genus name Cora. Calvert stated that the name refers to the reduced wing venation of Miocora in comparison with Cora.
