= Phillip Calvert =

Phillip Calvert may refer to:

- Phill Calvert (born 1958), Australian musician
- Phillip Calvert (governor) (c. 1626–1682), fifth governor of Maryland
- Philip Powell Calvert (1871–1961), American entomologist
