= List of damselflies of the world (Polythoridae) =

- Chalcopteryx machadoi
- Chalcopteryx radians
- Chalcopteryx rutilans
- Chalcopteryx scintillans
- Chalcopteryx seabrai
- Chalcothore montgomeryi
- Cora chiribiquete
- Cora chirripa
- Cora confusa
- Cora cyane
- Cora dorata
- Cora dualis
- Cora inca
- Cora irene
- Cora jocosa
- Cora klenri
- Cora lugubris
- Cora marina
- Cora modesta
- Cora munda
- Cora notoxantha
- Cora obscura
- Cora parda
- Cora semiopaca
- Cora skinneri
- Cora subfumat'
- Cora terminalis
- Cora xanthostoma
- Euthore fasciata
- Euthore fassli
- Euthore hyalina
- Euthore inlactea
- Euthore leroii
- Euthore mirabilis
- Miocora pellucida
- Miocora peraltica
- Polythore aurora
- Polythore batesi
- Polythore beata
- Polythore boliviana
- Polythore concinna
- Polythore derivata
- Polythore gigantea
- Polythore lamerceda
- Polythore manua
- Polythore mutata
- Polythore neopicta
- Polythore ornata
- Polythore picta
- Polythore procera
- Polythore spaeteri
- Polythore terminata
- Polythore victoria
- Polythore vittata
- Polythore williamsoni
- Stenocora percornuta
