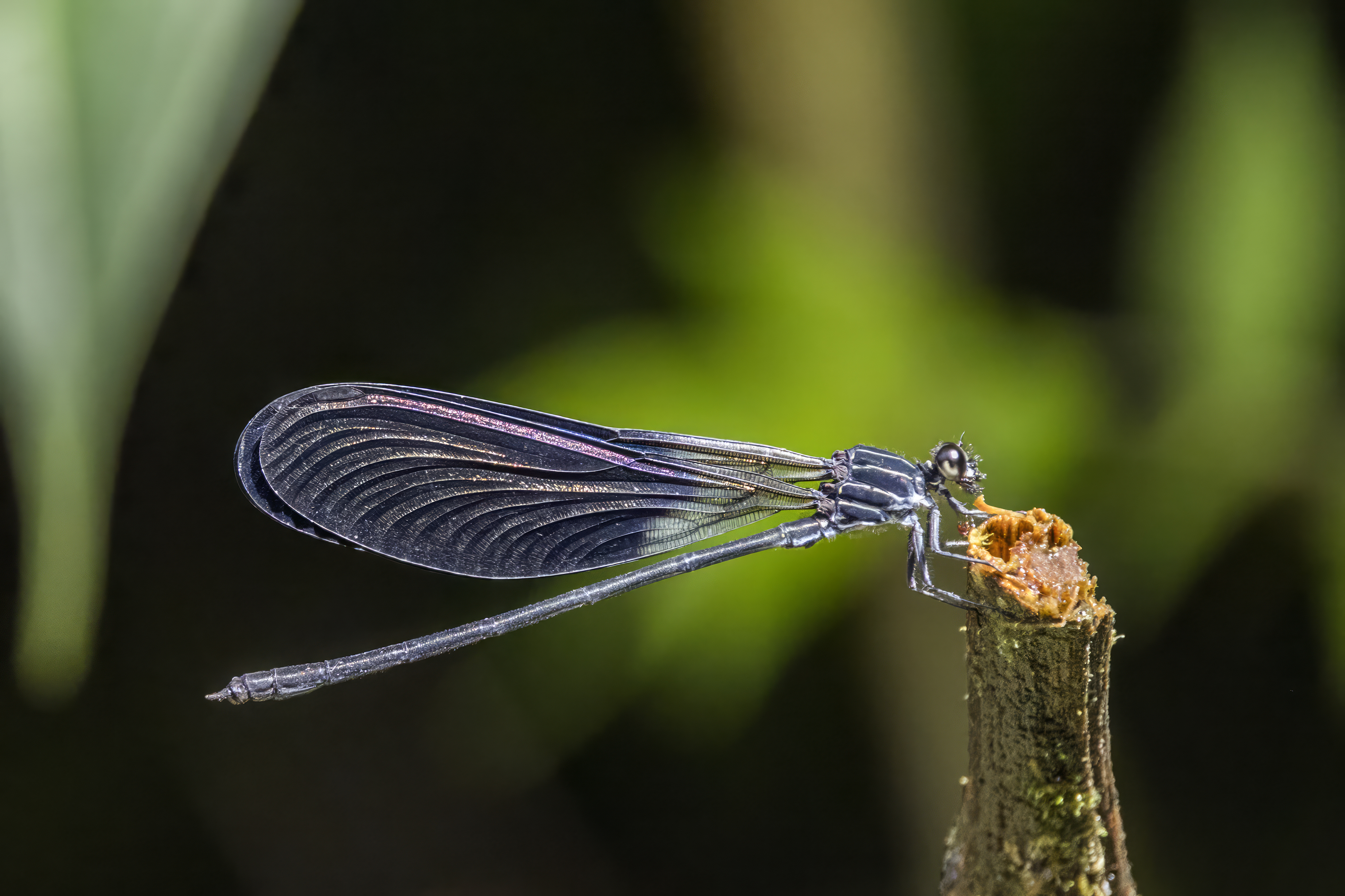
- Male
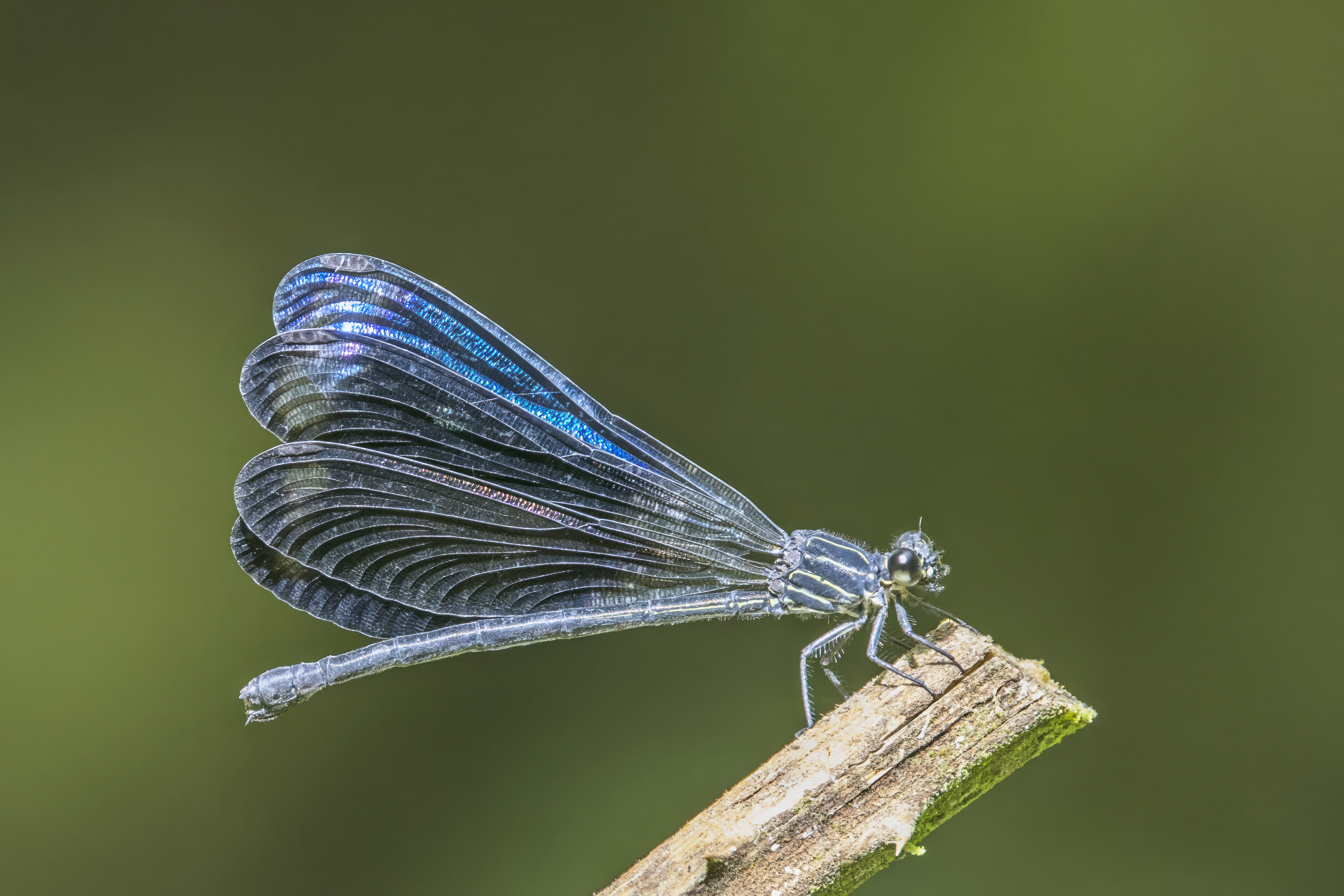
- Female both Polythore gigantea Colombia

Scientific classification
- Kingdom: Animalia
- Phylum: Arthropoda
- Clade: Pancrustacea
- Class: Insecta
- Order: Odonata
- Suborder: Zygoptera
- Family: Polythoridae
- Genus: Polythore; Calvert, 1917

= Polythore =

Genus of damselflies

Polythore is a genus of damselflies in the family Polythoridae. There are over 20 described species in Polythore.

== Species ==
The following species are currently placed in Polythore:

- Polythore albistriata Bota-Sierra & Sánchez Herrera, 2023
- Polythore aurora (Selys, 1879)^{i c g}
- Polythore batesi (Selys, 1869)^{i c g}
- Polythore beata (McLachlan, 1869)^{i c g}
- Polythore boliviana (McLachlan, 1878)^{i c g}
- Polythore chiribiquete (Zloty & Pritchard, 2001)
- Polythore concinna (McLachlan, 1881)^{i c g}
- Polythore derivata (McLachlan, 1881)^{i c g}
- Polythore gigantea (Selys, 1853)^{i c g}
- Polythore koepckei Börzsöny, 2013
- Polythore lamerceda Bick and Bick, 1985^{i c g}
- Polythore manua Bick and Bick, 1990^{i c g}
- Polythore mutata (McLachlan, 1881)^{i c g}
- Polythore neopicta Bick and Bick, 1990^{i c g}
- Polythore ornata (Selys, 1879)^{i c g}
- Polythore picta (Rambur, 1842)^{i c g}
- Polythore procera (Selys, 1869)^{i c g}
- Polythore spaeteri Burmeister and Börzsöny, 2003^{i c g}
- Polythore terminata Fraser, 1946^{i c g}
- Polythore vexilla Tennessen, 2024
- Polythore victoria (McLachlan, 1869)^{i c g}
- Polythore vittata (Selys, 1869)^{i c g}
- Polythore williamsoni (Förster, 1903)^{i c g}

Data sources: i = ITIS, c = Catalogue of Life, g = GBIF,

== Etymology ==
The genus name Polythore was introduced by Calvert in 1917 as a replacement for Thore Selys, 1853, which was preoccupied by a name previously used for a genus of spiders. Calvert stated that the name Polythore refers to the denser wing venation of its members compared with other genera in the group.
