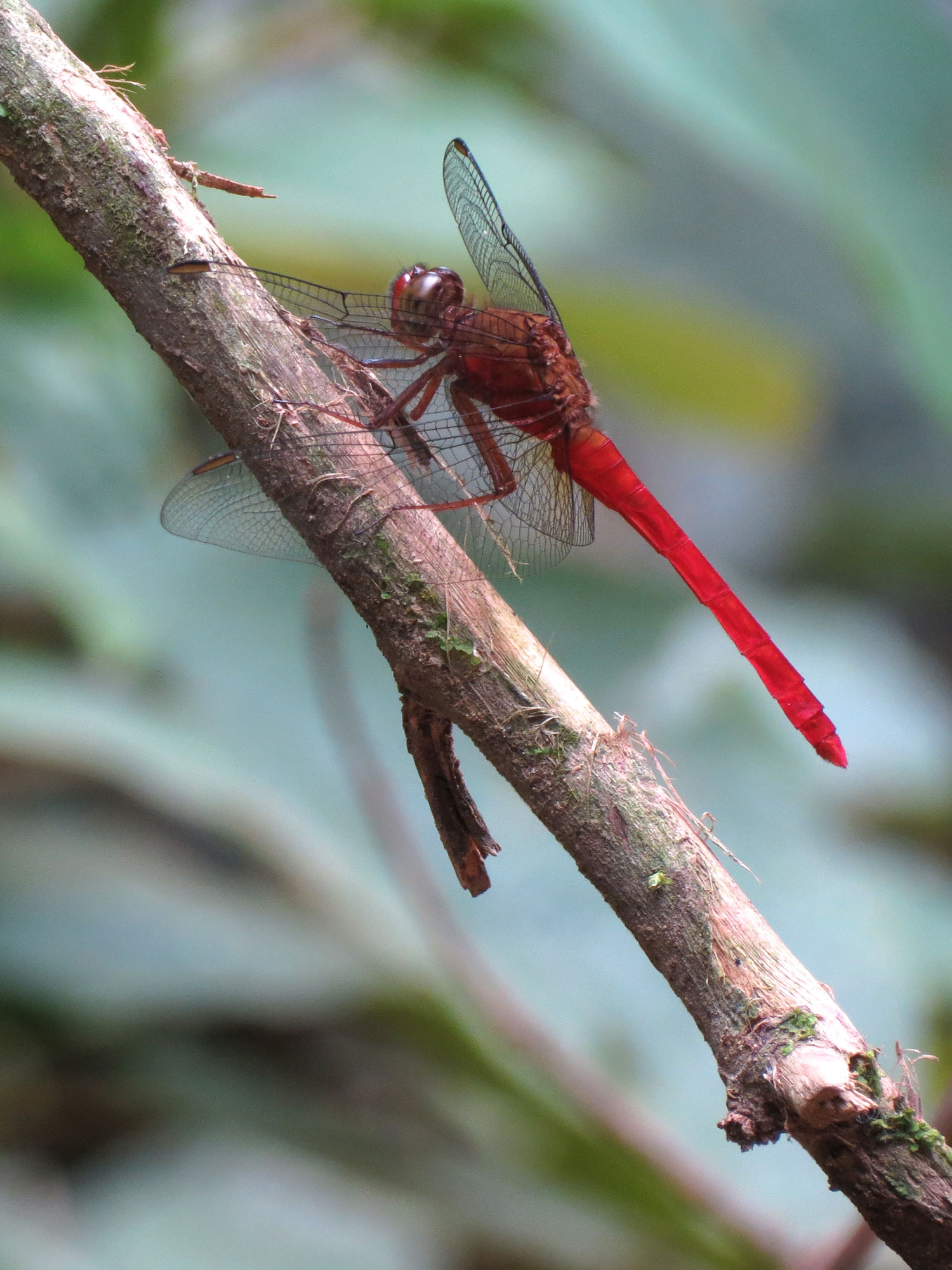
- Rhodopygia hinei in Panama

Scientific classification
- Kingdom: Animalia
- Phylum: Arthropoda
- Class: Insecta
- Order: Odonata
- Infraorder: Anisoptera
- Family: Libellulidae
- Genus: Rhodopygia
- Species: R. hinei

Binomial name
- Rhodopygia hinei Calvert, 1906

= Rhodopygia hinei =

Species of dragonfly

Rhodopygia hinei, is a species of dragonfly in the family Libellulidae.

== Distribution ==
Rhodopygia hinei is found in Central and South America, including Belize, Guatemala, Costa Rica, Panama, and Ecuador.

== Description ==
The male has a bright red abdomen, typical of many skimmer dragonflies, while females are generally duller in coloration.

== Gallery ==
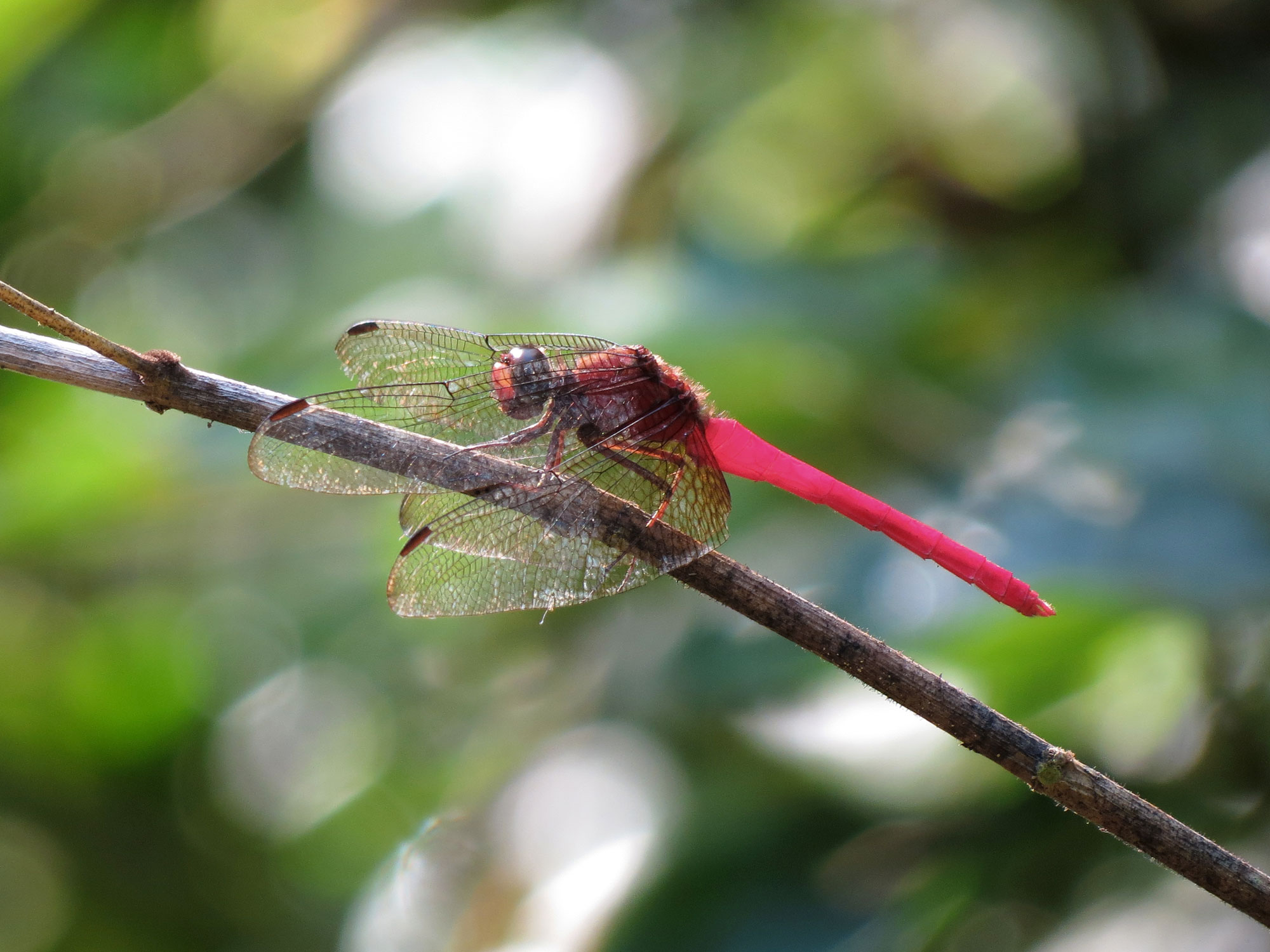

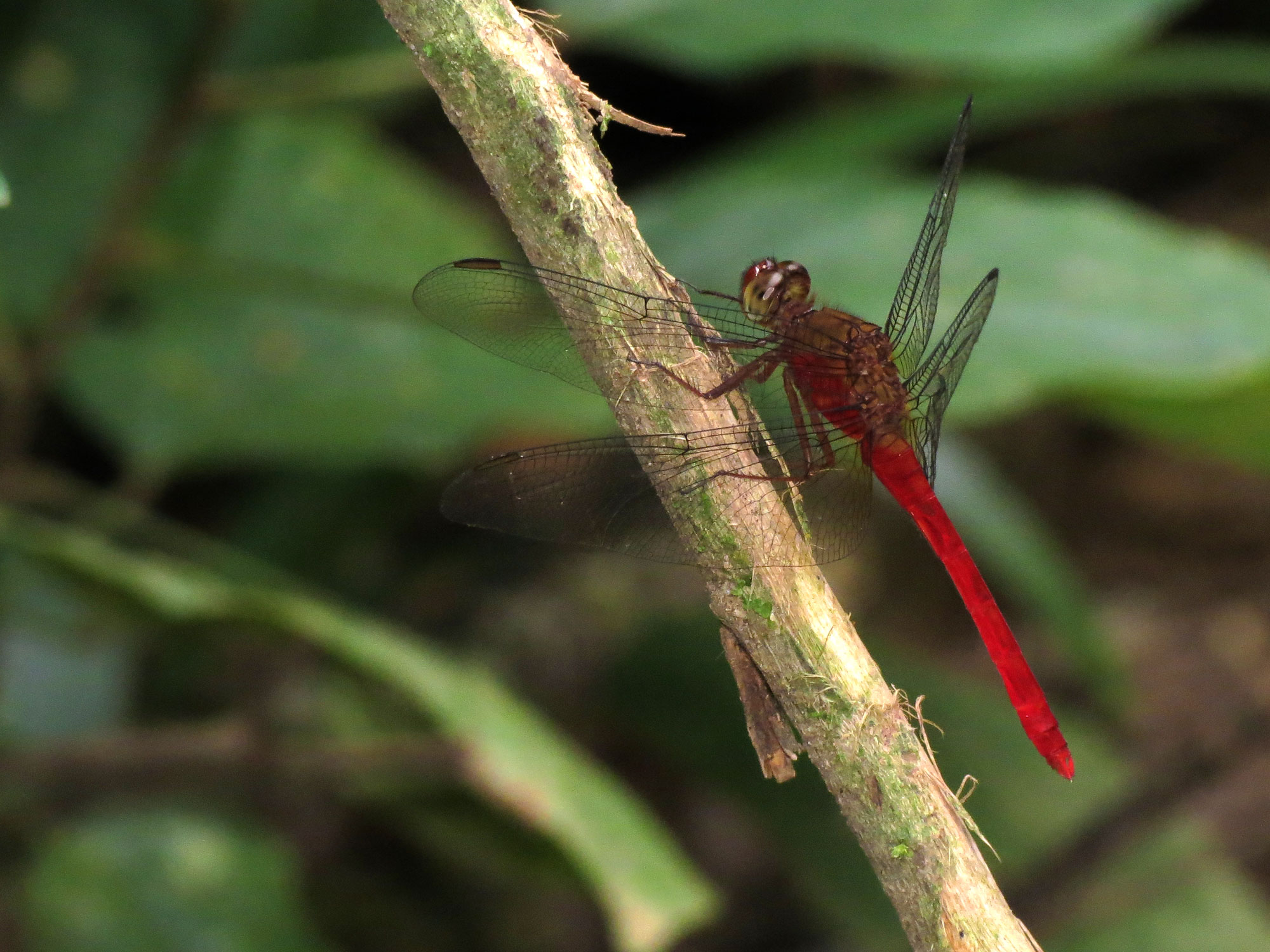

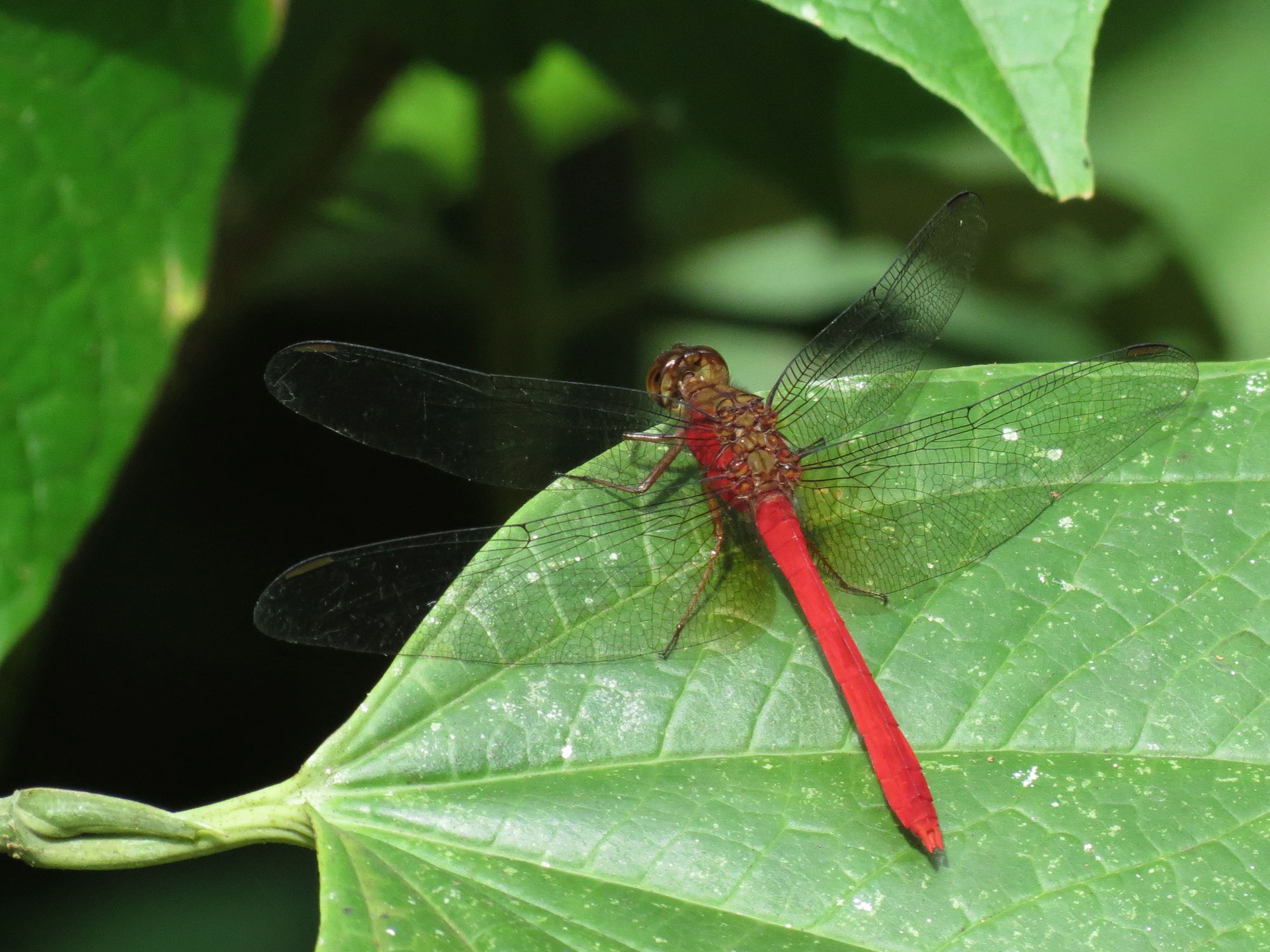
