= Thomas Gerard (colonist) =

Landowner in colonial Maryland and Virginia

Doctor Thomas Gerard Esquire
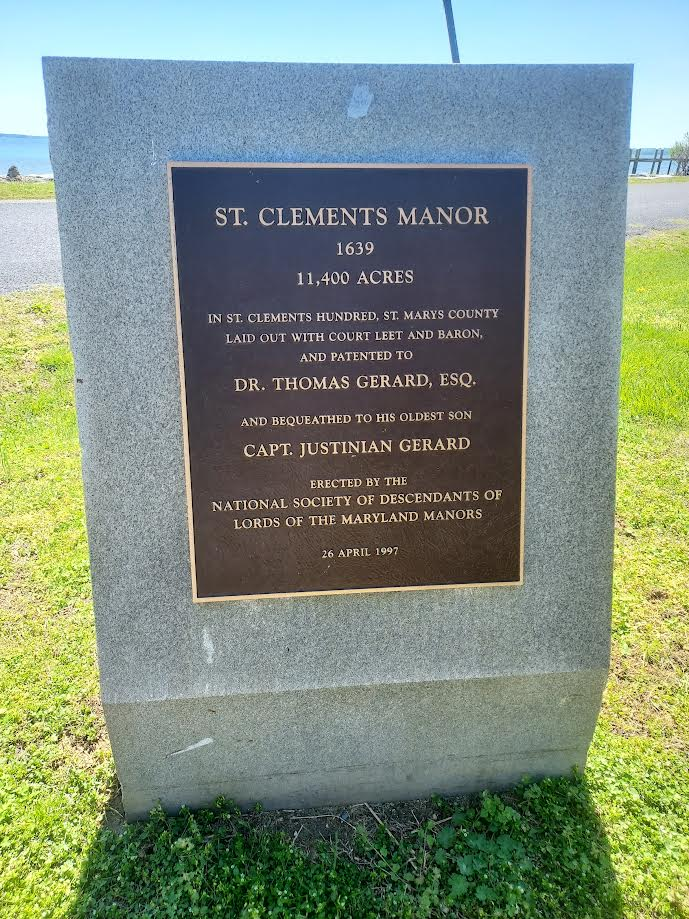
- Plaque at St. Clement's Island State Park
- Born: baptised 10 December 1608; Winwick, Lancashire, England
- Died: 1673; Westmoreland County, Virginia
- Other name: Gerrard [sic]
- Spouse: Susannah Snow
- Children: 8, including Susannah and Frances

Thomas Gerard (1608–1673) was a prominent manor owner in colonial Maryland, which was an English and later British colony in North America. Born into a Catholic family in England, he arrived in Maryland in 1638, and was granted 1,030 acres by Cecil Calvert, 2nd Baron Baltimore, which he named "Saint Clement’s Manor". This manor included St. Clement's Island, which was the landing site of the first Maryland colonists in 1634. He later became an extensive colonial landowner, owning around 12,000-16,000 acres in Maryland, and 3,500 acres in Virginia. He also served at various times in the colonial legislature of the Maryland colony.

He was expelled from the colony in 1660 for participation in Fendall's Rebellion, although he returned to the colony after receiving a pardon in 1661. He died in 1673, in Westmoreland County, Virginia.

== Background ==
Gerard was born in Lancashire, England, the son of John Gerard of Newhall. His family was Catholic and of noble descent. He was a distant cousin of the Barons Gerard.

In 1629 he married Susannah Snow, (Note: Also spelt Snowe) who was the sister of Justinian Snow, a crew member aboard the Ark, one of the two ships that first transported colonists to Maryland. Susannah was a Protestant, and Thomas's children were Protestant in spite of his Catholicism.

== Maryland Colony ==
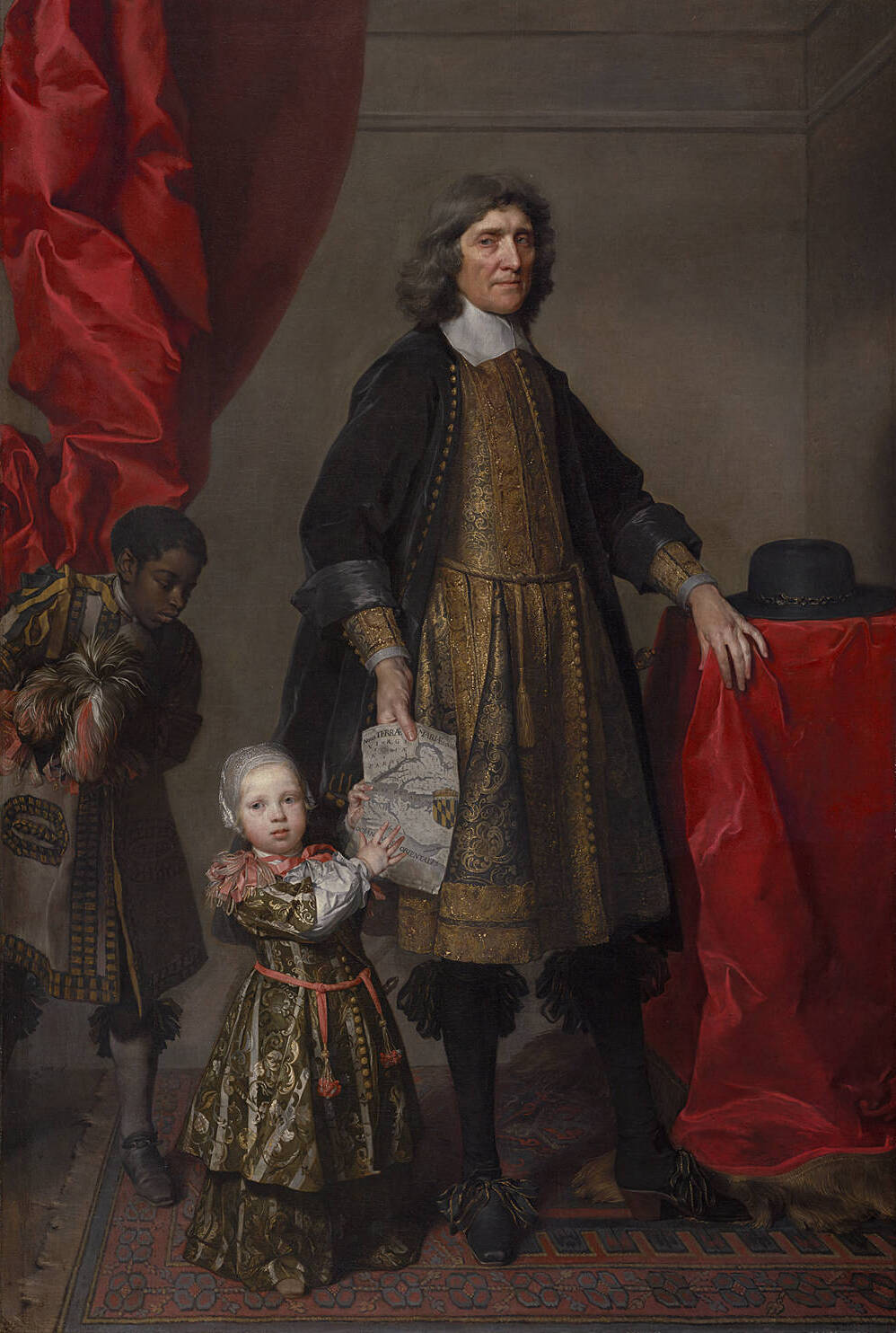
Cecil Calvert, 2nd Baron Baltimore

Gerard departed for the colony of Maryland in 1638, four years after the original landing at St. Clement's Island. He was a physician as well as a surgeon, and had a reputation in the colony as a result. In 1639 he assumed ownership of his brother-in-law Justinian Snow's property in St. Mary's City, Maryland, after his death at sea. That same year he was issued a major manorial grant of 1,030 acres, including St. Clement's Island by Cecil Calvert, 2nd Baron Baltimore to assist with the developing Maryland manor system. Gerard named his manor “Saint Clement’s Manor". In 1640 he returned to England, however he eventually returned to Maryland, bringing over five servants with him. By 1648 he had imported over forty. In 1650 he permanently settled in the New World and brought over his family.

He was the only manor lord in Maryland to hold manorial courts. Through his importation of indentured servants and slaves, he became owner of thousands of acres around the Potomac River, supporting Cecil Calvert's idea of a manorial dominated colony.

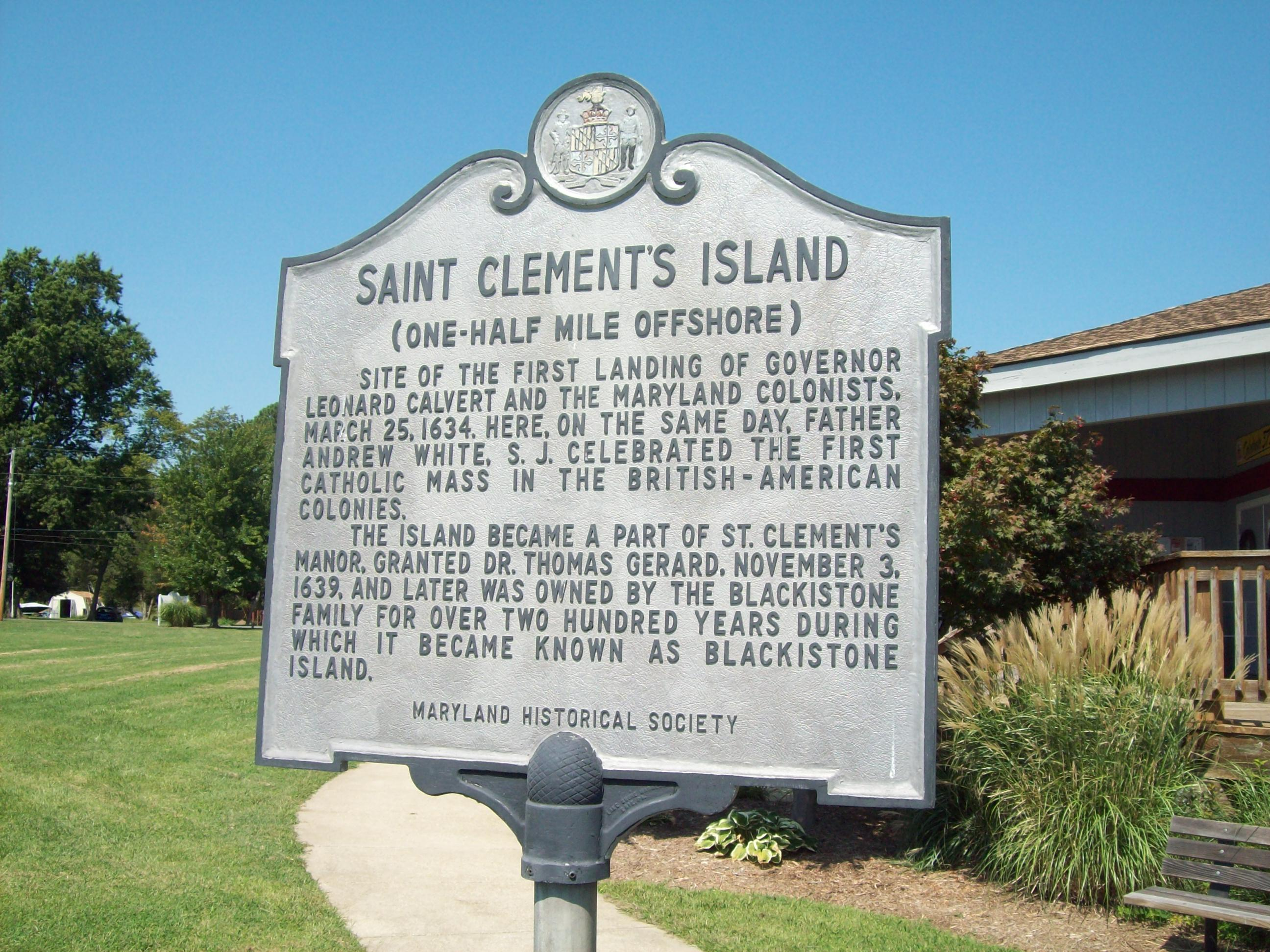
St. Clement's Island Historical Marker

Despite his support for Calvert's ideas, he was constantly at odds with the Calvert family, as well as other members of the colony. These disputes often resulted in lawsuits.

== Rebellion ==
Throughout his time in the colony, Thomas Gerard served in multiple positions in the Maryland legislature. He initially served in the lower house from 1638 to 1642, then in the upper house from 1658 to 1660. He also served on the Governor's Council from 1643 to 1649. He resumed this position from 1651 to 1660. (Note: Temporarily suspended in October 1658 for unfairly criticizing other members. His suspension ended a year later) It was during his time in the Governor's council that he came to support the failed rebellion of Governor Josias Fendall in 1660. The rebellion was planned at a meeting held at Gerard's residence. The rebellion was quickly defeated however, and Philip Calvert was declared the new Governor of Maryland by Cecil Calvert. As punishment for his participation in the rebellion, Gerard was banished from the colony.

== Later life ==
Thomas Gerard received a pardon in 1661, and subsequently returned to Maryland. However, he was unable to return to the prevalence he once had.

In 1664, he decided to move to the Colony of Virginia, where he also owned land. Thomas died in 1673, in Westmoreland County, Virginia, around the age of 65. His will was probated later that year.

By the end of his life, Thomas Gerard owned thousands of acres in both Maryland and Virginia (between 12,000 and 16,000 acres in Maryland, and 3,500 acres in Virginia). This made him one of the wealthiest landowners in the Maryland colony behind Cecil Calvert.

Gerard jointly invested in a piece of land in-between Maryland and Virginia, which is now Capitol Hill, however Gerard had withdrawn from the investment by the time he died.

== Family ==
Thomas Gerard and his wife Susannah (Snow) Gerard had eight children, who were characterized by their numerous and at times significant marriages.

- Captain Justinian Gerard, who married Sarah Tucker, no issue.
- Thomas Gerard, who married Ann, no issue.
- Susannah Gerard, who married firstly Robert Slye, had issue. Married secondly to John Coode, Leader of the Protestant Associators of Maryland, and had issue.
- Frances Gerard, who married 5 times, most notably to John Washington, Great-Grandfather of George Washington, with whom she had no issue. However, she did have children from her other marriages, and was the ancestor of Anne Aylett Washington.
- Temperance Gerard, who married three times. Firstly to Daniel Hutt, a merchant who was present at Saint Clement's Manor before Fendall's Rebellion. Secondly to John Crabb, and thirdly to Benjamin Branchflower. Had issue from all 3 marriages.
- Elizabeth Gerard, who married Nehemiah Blakiston, who succeeded John Coode as Leader of the Protestant Associators of Maryland, had issue. Married secondly to Ralph Rymer, no issue. Married thirdly to Joshua Guibert, no issue.
- John Gerard, who had one son and one daughter, both of whom died without issue.
- Mary Gerard, who married Kenelm Cheseldine, had issue.

After Susannah died, Thomas remarried to Rose Tucker, although they had no issue. However, William Fitzhugh descended from Rose's daughter Sarah from her previous marriage.
