= Cora aurea =

Conservation status
- Least Concern (IUCN 3.1)

Scientific classification
- Kingdom: Animalia
- Phylum: Arthropoda
- Class: Insecta
- Order: Odonata
- Suborder: Zygoptera
- Family: Polythoridae
- Genus: Cora
- Species: C. aurea

Binomial name
- Cora aurea (Ris, 1918)

Species of damselfly

Cora aurea is a species of damselfly in the family Polythoridae known commonly as the black-banded bannerwing. It is endemic to Colombia, where it has been noted at only three locations.
