= Euthore =

Scientific classification
- Kingdom: Animalia
- Phylum: Arthropoda
- Clade: Pancrustacea
- Class: Insecta
- Order: Odonata
- Suborder: Zygoptera
- Family: Polythoridae
- Genus: Euthore; Selys, 1869

Genus of damselflies

Euthore is a genus of damselflies in the family Polythoridae. There are about eight described species in Euthore.

== Species ==
These eight species belong to the genus Euthore:

- Euthore fasciata (Hagen in Selys, 1853)^{i c g}
- Euthore fassli Ris, 1914^{i c g}
- Euthore fastigiata (Selys, 1859)^{i}
- Euthore hyalina (Selys, 1853)^{i c g}
- Euthore inlactea Calvert, 1909^{i c g}
- Euthore leroii Ris, 1918^{i c g}
- Euthore meridana Selys, 1879^{i g}
- Euthore mirabilis McLachlan, 1878^{i c g}

Data sources: i = ITIS, c = Catalogue of Life, g = GBIF, b = Bugguide.net
