= John Douglas Sr. =

Maryland colonist (c.1636-1678/79)

John Douglas, or Douglass (ca. 1636-ca. 1678/79) was born in Great Britain. He immigrated to Maryland as an adult in the 1650s. In Maryland he became a planter and a politician in Charles County. He married Sarah Bouls (alternatively Bowles) and they had seven children.

Douglas served as a justice of Charles County from 1672 to 1678. At the time of his election to public office, he held over 450 acres (180 ha) of land. Douglas became a captain in the Maryland militia in 1675.

In 1676, Douglas became a major and colonel. In 1677, Douglas acquired Cold Spring Manor, a 1,050-acre (420 ha) plantation, from Josias Fendall. Later, the property would become known for its association with subsequent owner, William Digges Clagett who built the Clagett House at the site.

Douglas died in the period between late December 1678 and the end of January 1679. At his death, he owned 1,600 acres (650 ha) of land.
