= Amelia Smith Calvert =

American botanist (1876–1965)

- Born: 1876; Philadelphia, Pennsylvania
- Died: December 15, 1965 (aged 88–89); Chester, Pennsylvania
- Known for: Study of Costa Rican flora
- Spouse: Philip Powell Calvert
- Scientific career
- Fields: Botany
- Author abbrev. (botany): A.S.Calvert

Amelia Smith Calvert (1876 in Philadelphia – December 15, 1965, in Chester) was an American botanist noted for studying the flora of Costa Rica with her husband, entomologist Philip Powell Calvert.

== Life and work ==
Amelia attended Girls’ High (at that time called The Girls’ Normal School) and then enrolled at the University of Pennsylvania, where she studied botany.

After earning her bachelor's degree from Penn in 1899, Amelia took on a research fellowship at Bryn Mawr College focusing on embryology and earthworm physiology. Her results were published in the journals Anatomischer Anzeiger and the American Journal of Physiology.

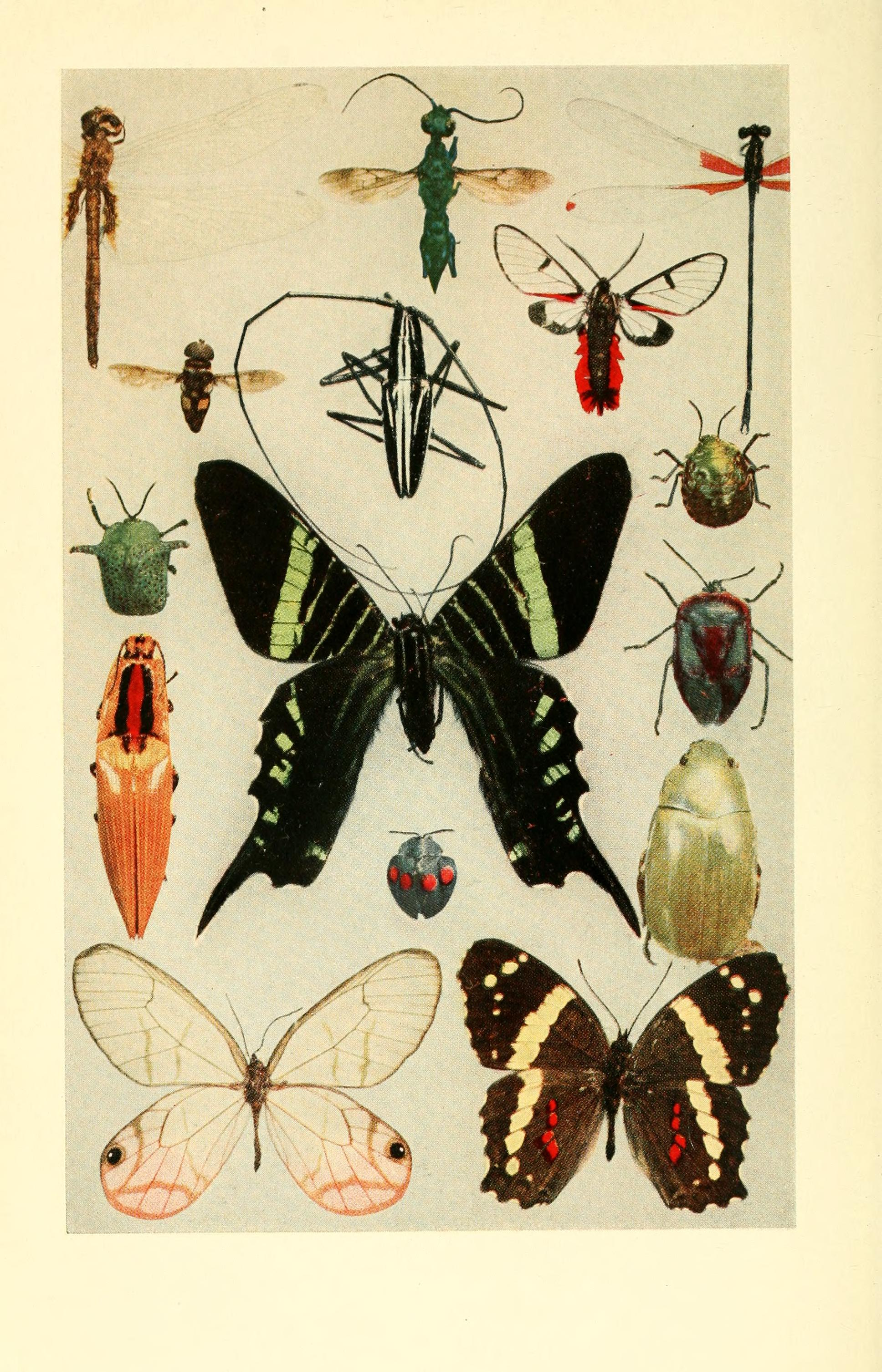
Animal life that Phillip Powell Calvert studied while Phillip and Amelia were in Costa Rica.

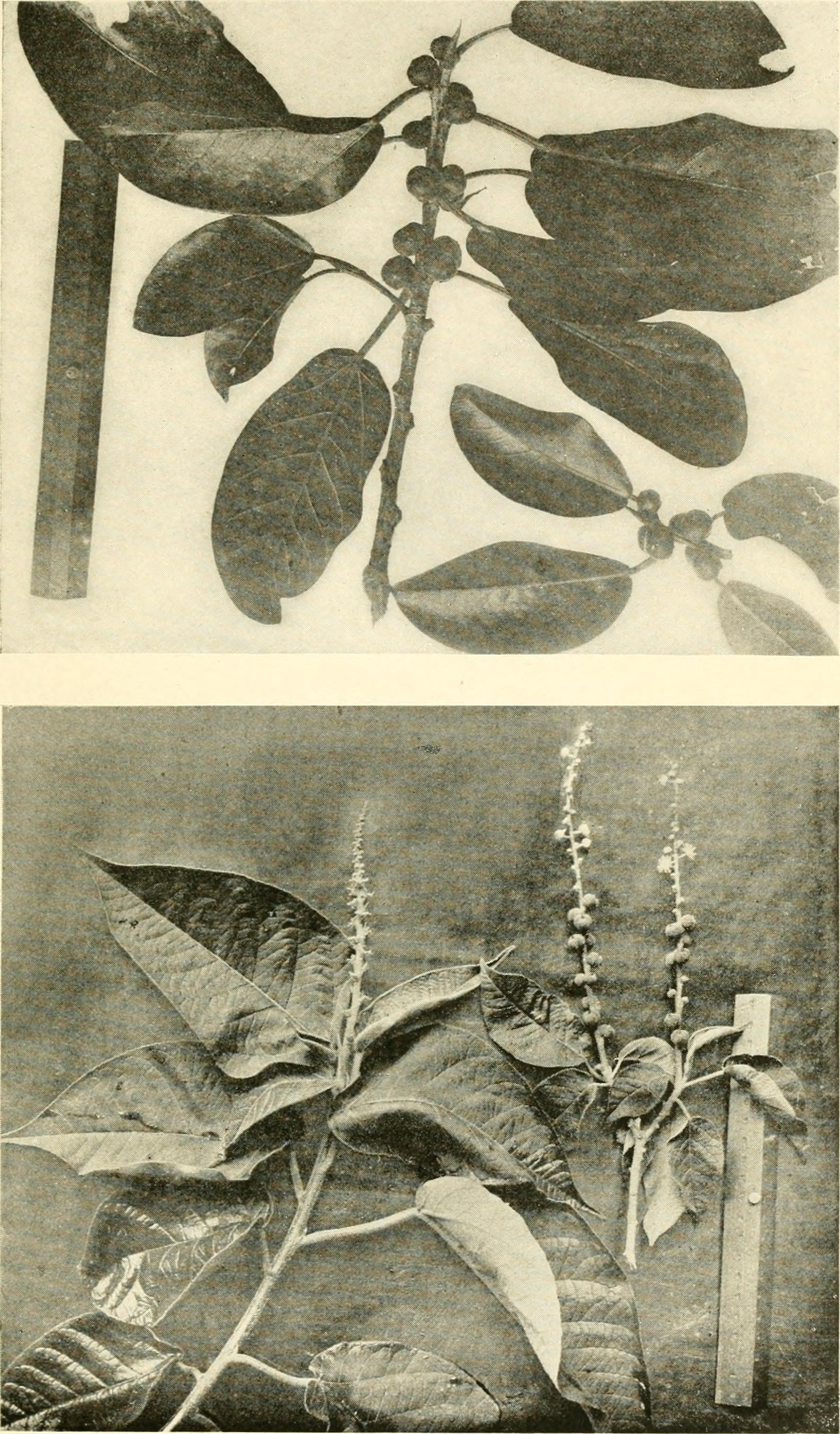
Image of the flora that Amelia Smith Calvert studied while in Costa Rica.

Amelia Smith Calvert became a demonstrator in zoology at the University of Pennsylvania where, briefly, she was a graduate student from 1904 to 1906.

In 1909 Amelia Smith Calvert moved to Costa Rica with husband Philip Powell Calvert, where he would carry out entomological research for two years on some of animal species such as caterpillars. While spending this time in Costa Rica, Amelia would go on to study the inhabitants of the flora. Her trip was far from a vacation, she hiked across the province of Cartago, to rainforest waterfalls and active volcanoes, through pastures and parks, along riverbeds and alleyways, collecting and photographing the region's plants. She created, "Photographs of Costa Rican plants" which is a two-volume album composed by Amelia from material collected on a 1909 to 1910 expedition to Costa Rica. Each page of the album features a black and white photograph of a plant native to the region, with up to a paragraph of type-written text that provides the Latin and common names of the plant, its appearance and characteristics, the specific location of the specimen and the date on which the photograph was taken. Most of the photographs show specimens in situ, but some (especially those with delicate or unusual foliage and flowers) have been photographed in front of a plain backdrop and often alongside a twenty-centimeter scale. In 1910, the couple returned from their trip after barely surviving a violent earthquake that destroyed their hotel. They also traveled extensively in Europe, and voyaged to Britain in 1912 and to Belgium, the Netherlands, Switzerland and Italy in 1929, which are recorded in Amelia Calvert's diaries, held at the American Philosophical Society.

== A Year of Costa Rican Natural History ==
In 1917, Amelia and Philip published their book A Year Of Costa Rican Natural History. In the study of the fauna and flora Calvert found that many flowers would bloom in a dry season where many of these flowers would dry out. This was important where they would be a source of food for many of the insects that Philip Powell Calvert was studying such as butterflies and dragonflies. Her book also featured photos of villages and the indigenous peoples of Costa Rica during her trip. Images included buildings, portraits, and traditional events alongside her flower research.

== Panama disease ==
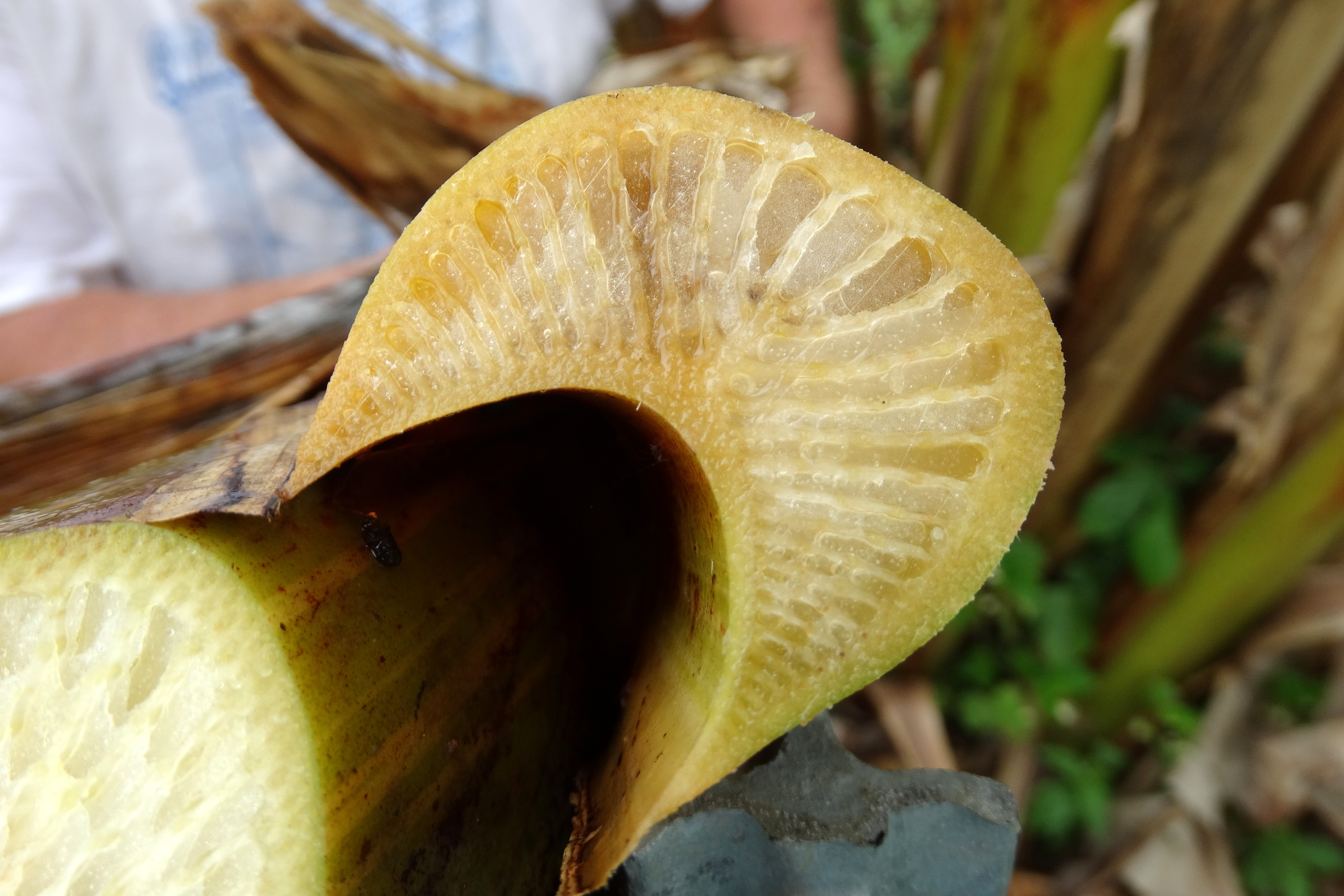
Brown coloration in the bananas that were affected by the Panama disease.

Amelia's travel led to her study of Panama disease in some of the plant life. Among those plants were bananas and how they reproduce and grow. In her studies of the banana plantations she found a dark brown hue. This hue is an insignificant coloration only for healthy bananas so it was important to study about the rapid growth of the Panama disease.

The standard author abbreviation A.S.Calvert is used to indicate this person as the author when citing a botanical name.

== Selected work ==
Calvert, Amelia Smith; Calvert, Philip Powell (1917). A year of Costa Rican natural history. New York, The Macmillan company.
