= Chalcopteryx =

Scientific classification
- Kingdom: Animalia
- Phylum: Arthropoda
- Clade: Pancrustacea
- Class: Insecta
- Order: Odonata
- Suborder: Zygoptera
- Family: Polythoridae
- Genus: Chalcopteryx; Selys, 1853

Genus of damselflies

Chalcopteryx is a genus of damselflies in the family Polythoridae. There are about five described species in Chalcopteryx.

== Species ==
These five species belong to the genus Chalcopteryx:

- Chalcopteryx machadoi Costa, 2005^{c g}
- Chalcopteryx radians Ris, 1914^{i c g}
- Chalcopteryx rutilans (Rambur, 1842)^{i c g}
- Chalcopteryx scintillans McLachlan, 1870^{i c g}
- Chalcopteryx seabrai Santos and Machado, 1961^{i c g}

Data sources: i = ITIS, c = Catalogue of Life, g = GBIF, b = Bugguide.net
