= Polythoridae =

Scientific classification
- Kingdom: Animalia
- Phylum: Arthropoda
- Clade: Pancrustacea
- Class: Insecta
- Order: Odonata
- Suborder: Zygoptera
- Superfamily: Polythoroidea
- Family: Polythoridae; Munz, 1919

Genera
- Chalcopteryx; Chalcothore; Cora; Euthore; Miocora; Polythore; Stenocora
- Distribution of Polythoridae

Family of damselflies

Polythoridae is a family of damselflies in the superfamily Polythoroidea, found in the tropical regions of Central and South America. Commonly known as bannerwings, they inhabit forest streams and are noted for their broad, often brightly patterned wings.

The family contains about 60 recognised species in seven genera and has long been recognised as a distinct evolutionary lineage of damselflies.

== Description ==
Polythorids are medium-sized damselflies associated with streams and rivers in tropical forests. They are commonly known as bannerwings because many species possess broad wings marked with striking bands, spots or patches of colour.

The larvae are unusual among damselflies in possessing additional gills along the sides of the abdomen as well as the three terminal tail gills. These gills are swollen and may bear angular or finger-like projections. Adults are recognised by their broad, densely veined wings, many species displaying striking bands and patches of colour.

== Distribution and habitat ==
Members of the family occur in the Neotropical region, from Central America into South America. They inhabit streams and rivers in forested habitats, where adults are commonly encountered flying or perching along shaded watercourses.

== Taxonomic history ==
Polythoridae has long been recognised as a distinctive family of Neotropical damselflies. Similarities between the larvae of Polythoridae and Euphaeidae led some authors to suggest a close relationship between the two families. However, morphological and molecular studies have consistently recovered Polythoridae as a distinct lineage, and modern classifications regard the family as monophyletic.

In 2026, Carter and colleagues placed Polythoridae within the newly recognised superfamily Polythoroidea, together with Dicteriadidae, Heteragrionidae, Hypolestidae, Mesagrionidae, Philogeniidae and Rimanellidae, reflecting phylogenomic evidence for the relationships among these predominantly Neotropical damselfly lineages.

== Genera ==
The following genera are currently placed in Polythoridae:

- Chalcopteryx Selys, 1853
- Chalcothore De Marmels, 1988
- Cora Selys, 1853
- Euthore Selys, 1869
- Miocora Calvert, 1917
- Polythore Calvert, 1917
- Stenocora Kennedy, 1940

== Etymology ==
The family name Polythoridae is derived from the genus Polythore, with the standard zoological suffix -idae used for animal families.

The genus name Polythore was introduced by Calvert in 1917 as a replacement for Thore Selys, 1853, which was preoccupied by a name previously used for a genus of spiders. Calvert stated that the name Polythore refers to the denser wing venation of its members compared with other genera in the group.

== See also ==
- List of damselflies of the world (Polythoridae)
