= Chalcothore montgomeryi =

Conservation status
- Least Concern (IUCN 3.1)

Scientific classification
- Kingdom: Animalia
- Phylum: Arthropoda
- Clade: Pancrustacea
- Class: Insecta
- Order: Odonata
- Suborder: Zygoptera
- Family: Polythoridae
- Genus: Chalcothore
- Species: C. montgomeryi

Binomial name
- Chalcothore montgomeryi (Rácenis, 1968)

Species of damselfly

Chalcothore montgomeryi is a species of damselfly in the family Polythoridae. It is endemic to Venezuela. Its natural habitat is rivers. It is threatened by habitat loss.
