= Josias Fendall =

Governor of Maryland

4th Proprietary Governor of Maryland
- In office July 10, 1656 – June 24, 1660
- Preceded by: William Stone
- Succeeded by: Phillip Calvert

Personal details
- Born: 1628
- Died: 1687 (aged 58–59)

Josias Fendall (c. 1628 – c. 1687) was an English colonial administrator who served as the Proprietary Governor of Maryland. He was born in England, and came to the Province of Maryland. He was the progenitor of the Fendall family in America.

== Biography ==
=== Early Maryland life and the Battle of the Severn ===
Fendall's coat of arms

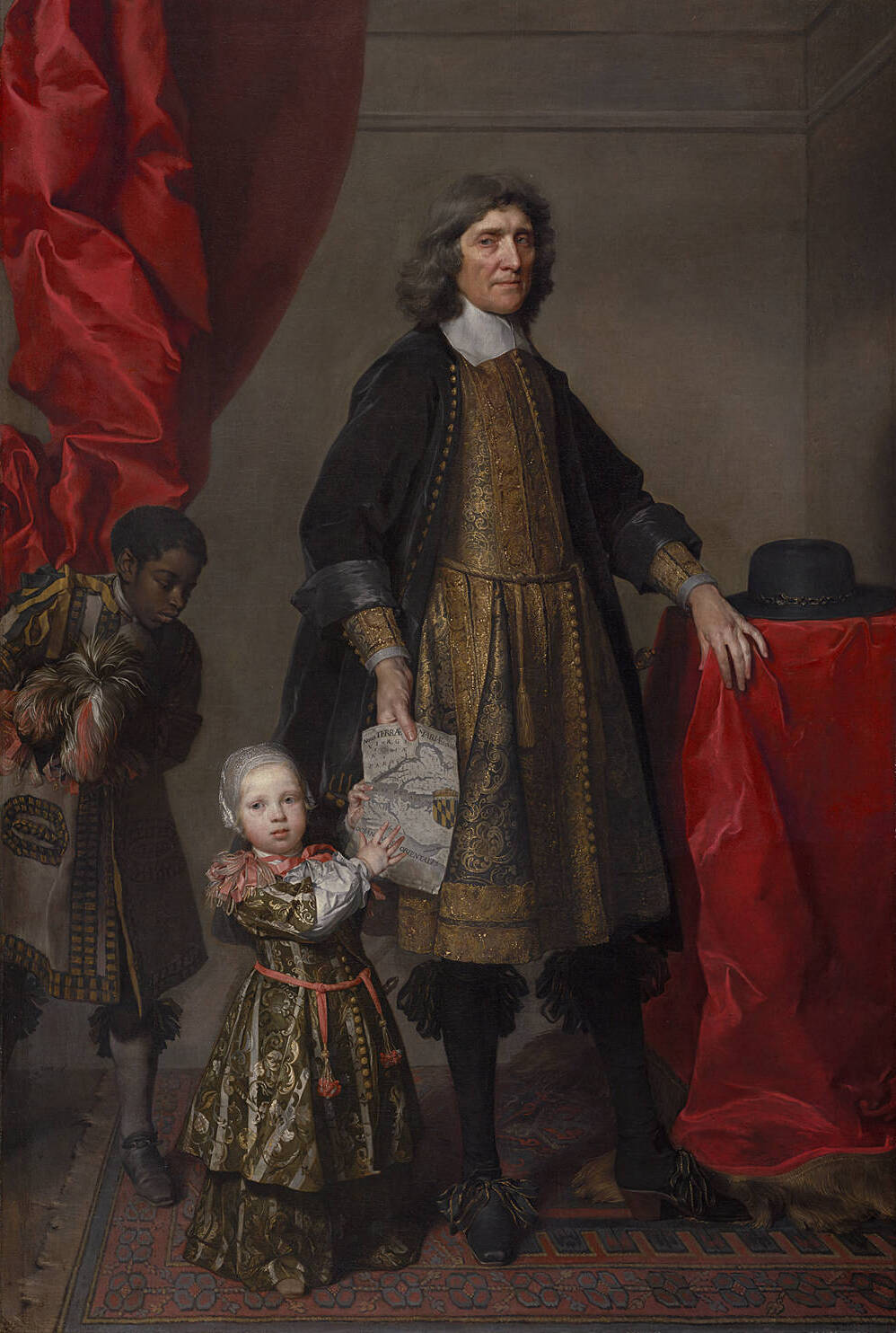
Cecil Calvert, 2nd Baron Baltimore

Although records do not mention when Fendall emigrated to the Province of Maryland, it is likely that he entered on board the ship Golden Fortune, which was commanded by Capt. Tilman, and arrived in Maryland in the latter part of January, 1655. Also on board this ship was William Eltonhead, Esq., who accompanied Fendall on his mission to Patuxent and later was executed following the Battle of the Severn. Eltonhead brought with him letters that blamed Governor William Stone for having resigned his government to the Lord Protector in July, 1654, and accusing him of cowardice in surrendering without striking a single blow. In addition the letters confirmed "that the Lord Baltimore kept his patent and that his highness, the lord protector, had neither taken the lord Baltimore's patent from him, nor his land". This probably instigated Gov. Stone to put into plan what became the Battle of Severn.

In 1655, William Stone (c. 1603–1659), the third proprietary governor of Maryland, was resisting the commissioners of Parliament for the government of that province. Stone commissioned Fendall, to be one of his officers, along with William Eltonhead, Esq. (c. 1616–1655) and twenty men, to seize some arms and ammunition at Patuxent, for the governor's force. They ransacked an area of about 40 square miles (100 km^{2}) which included the houses of Mr. Richard Preston "The Great Quaker" (c. 1618–1669) and John Sutton, who were prominent men. The arms and ammunition were gathered for the governor's force which was planning to attack the Puritan settlers at Providence. Providence was located on the north side at the mouth of the Severn River across from what is today Annapolis, Maryland and was the place of residence of most of the commissioners, and people that were forced out of Virginia by Governor Sir William Berkeley (1606–1677). Along with Governor Stone, who had been injured in the shoulder, Josias was taken prisoner in a conflict which resulted from the attempt, in the Battle of the Severn, by Captain William Fuller (died 1695) of the Puritan Army.

The Battle of the Severn, fought on Sunday, March 25, 1655, was the first battle ever fought between American soldiers on American soil. The battle was the only battle in America in which the flag of the Commonwealth of England was flown. The battle was also the first in which the Provincial flag of Maryland was flown (colors of black and yellow). Among the Proprietary Forces numbering about 225, there were 17 killed and 32 wounded.

Fendall was sentenced to death along with Gov. Stone and 10 others. However, only 4 sentences were actually carried out, including that of William Eltonhead. Before the remaining men could be executed, the people of Providence came before the War Council and petitioned the execution. They were awarded a hearing in which 3 petitioners in support of over 200 townspeople, who were members of the Puritan community, presented a defense for the prisoners. They claimed that the men should be spared, and that they should not judge treason. If they did, they would be guilty of the same transgression the government of Virginia had done to them. In addition the prisoners were only following orders handed out by Lord Baltimore. The War Council as a result reversed the sentences and the prisoners were released.

=== Governor of Maryland ===
Fendall's services were rewarded by a grant of two thousand acres (8 km^{2}) of land and by appointment, July 10, 1656, as governor from Cecil Calvert, 2nd Baron Baltimore, 1st Lord Proprietary. Before he could take any effective steps toward the organization of his government however, he was arrested by the Puritans on August 15, and held to answer to the charge of being "Dangerous to the public peace". He was remanded to prison until the affairs of the Province could be settled by Oliver Cromwell (1599–1658). However, Fendall became weary of his confinement and was released, September 24, upon taking an oath that he would not interfere with the government.

In 1657, he visited England, and in his absence, he appointed Dr. Luke Barber Sr. (c. 1615–1668) to administer the government. Barber had been the household physician of Oliver Cromwell, the Lord Protector, and was lord of the manor of Warburton Manor. Fendall returned February 26, 1658, and brought back an agreement from Cecil Calvert, 2nd Baron Baltimore (1605–1675). This agreement stated that the government was definitely restored to the proprietor, Governor Fendall, as well as a new commission curtailing his power as governor, with Philip Calvert (1626–1682), a younger brother of Cecil, as advisor. As a result of reading the Articles of Agreement from Lord Baltimore on March 23, Capt. William Fuller and the other commissioners formally surrendered the Provisional Government to Josias Fendall.

In the next two years, Fendall took the province a considerable distance away from the worst disorders of the decade. He persuaded the Puritans in the Severn area, which were now erected into a new county named Anne Arundel, to send representatives to an Assembly that he had established in Calvert County, halfway between their seat and St. Mary's City. The turmoil between the two parties was passed and there now sat two separate bodies, an upper house consisting of the governor and council and a lower house of elected delegates from each of the four counties (St. Mary's, Kent, Calvert, and Anne Arundel). Maryland was now a miniature parliament. Fendall showed legislative skill in shepherding several much needed laws through the Assembly. On May 10, 1658, Gov. Fendall proclaimed the region in which he resided Charles County, making it the 5th oldest county in the state, and quickly followed that with the formation of Baltimore County in the frontier area at the head of the bay.

Fendall was also responsible for increasing and improving the Maryland Militia. He divided the Province into districts in which a commander was put in charge of policing. In addition two regiments were organized.

One case of interest that occurred while Fendall was in office had to do with some unusual circumstances. On October 5, 1659, a Provincial Court met at Resurrection Manor in St. Mary's County, which was the house of Capt. George Reade Sr. (died 1669), to try Edward Prescott (died 1662) for hanging a witch named Elizabeth Richardson (died 1658). Fendall presided, and the charges were preferred by Col. John Washington (c. 1634–1677), an immigrant, and the great-grandfather of Gen. George Washington (1732–1799). Washington charged that in 1658, Prescott, a merchant, had committed a felony while hanging Richardson, on his ship Sea Horse of London as it was bound from England on the high seas, en route to Maryland. Trial was set, Prescott proved that though he was owner of the ship, he was not master at the time. Therefore, he was acquitted because of the absence of Washington, who could not attend due to the baptism of his son.

=== Fendall's Rebellion ===
Toward the end of his tenure as governor, Fendall was criticized by the proprietor for negligence at courts and for contradicting court orders. In March 1660, with a number of associates, including Capt. William Fuller (died 1695), and the Assembly, he suddenly attempted to overthrow the proprietary government. This was a bloodless rebellion against Lord Baltimore, probably instigated by the Cromwell Government in England, and was termed "Fendall's Rebellion".

This rebellion was instigated at a meeting of the Assembly, which took place at the residence of Dr. Thomas Gerard (1608–1673). On the tenth day, the Lower House sent a message to the governor and council, that they intended to be the highest court without being depended upon by the Upper House. Many compared this act to the time when the Commons of England had abolished the House of Lords and made themselves alone the Parliament of the realm. In addition this meant that they wanted to be independent of the Proprietor, Lord Baltimore. Two days of conferences resulted with the two bodies sitting as one. Thus, Maryland had gone back to a unicameral legislature of earlier times. Fendall accepted these conditions and tendered to the Assembly his resignation, as governor under Lord Baltimore, however at the same time, he accepted from the Assembly, a new commission. He attempted to set up in its place, a commonwealth in which the supreme power would be vested in a House of Burgesses. Over this body the governor was to preside; but the House, retaining its speaker, was to have the power to adjourn and dissolve. Secretary Philip Calvert, protested these proceedings and asked permission to leave.

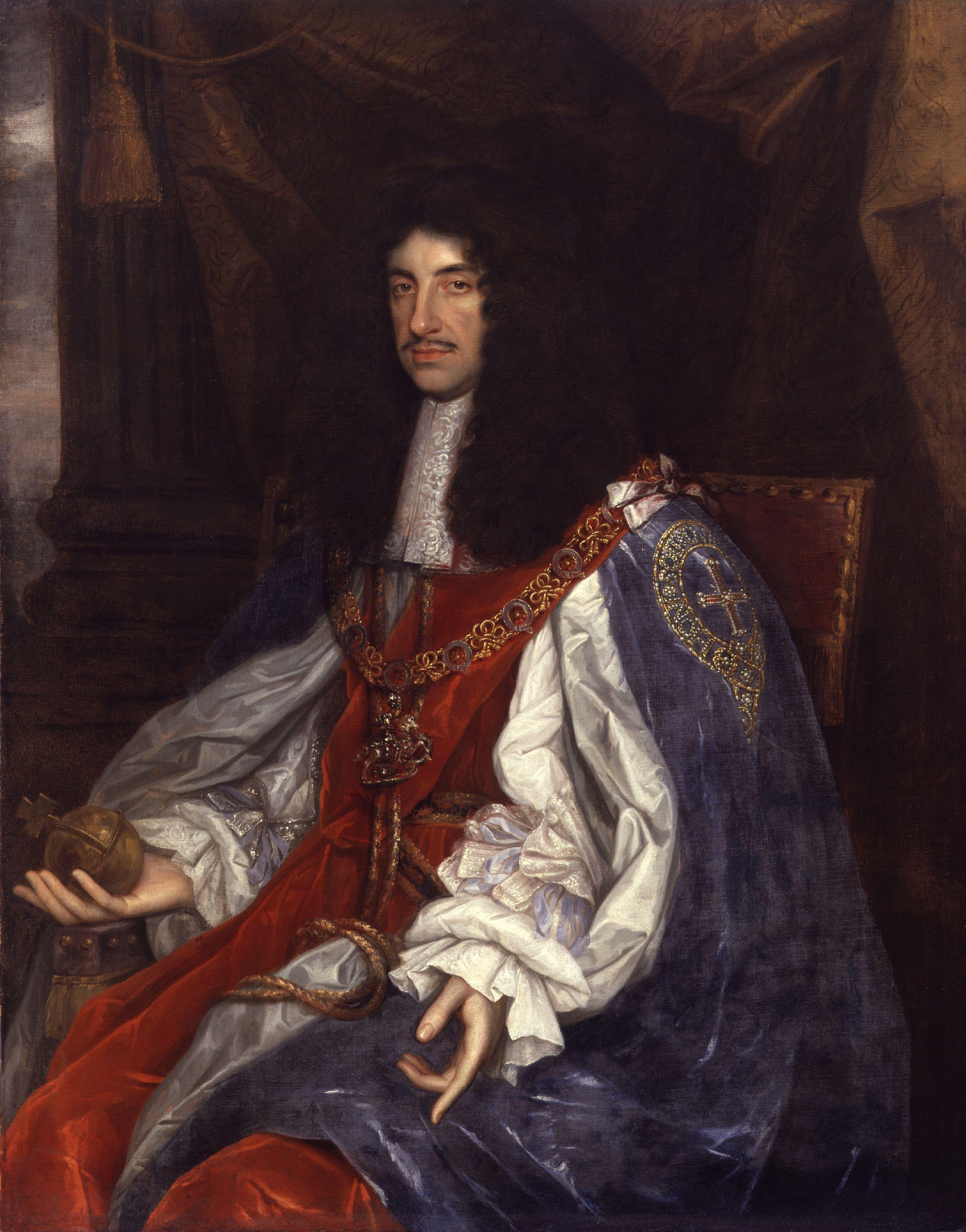
Charles II (1630–1685) was restored as King of England in 1660

The attempted revolution was easily frustrated, thanks to the fall of the Cromwell Government, May 29, 1660, and the return of Charles II (1630–1685) to England as King. On June 24, 1660, Lord Baltimore commissioned his younger brother and Josias' former advisor, Philip Calvert (1626–1682), as governor, and Charles II, commanded "obedience to him". The proprietor asked "that perfidious and perjured fellow, Fendall" to be arrested and forfeit his life. However, the provincial court only issued an order to confiscate his estate and banish him from the province.

Subsequently, in response to a petition for mercy to the Governor and council, and although the Lord proprietor had specially given injunction not to allow him to escape with his life, he was pardoned, and, his punishment was reduced to disfranchisement and disqualification for office.

=== Leaving office ===
He retired to his estate in Charles County where he had a wife, a daughter, a brother, and several servants. In 1678, the freemen of that county were disposed to elect him a delegate to the Assembly. However, fearing the possibility that he could foment disorder, the governor, Charles Calvert (1637–1714) 3rd Lord Baltimore, and his Council informed them that if he were elected his seat would be declared vacant.

In April 1679, he was charged with seditious utterances and a warrant was issued for his arrest, but he was not found. According to William Boyden, Josias was heard saying that, Lord Baltimore was a traitor and he could prove it, that people were fools if they paid taxes. He was also heard saying that it was time for people to speak their minds and say anything for it was not treason and he hoped within a few years to have more honor in the country than he ever had prior.

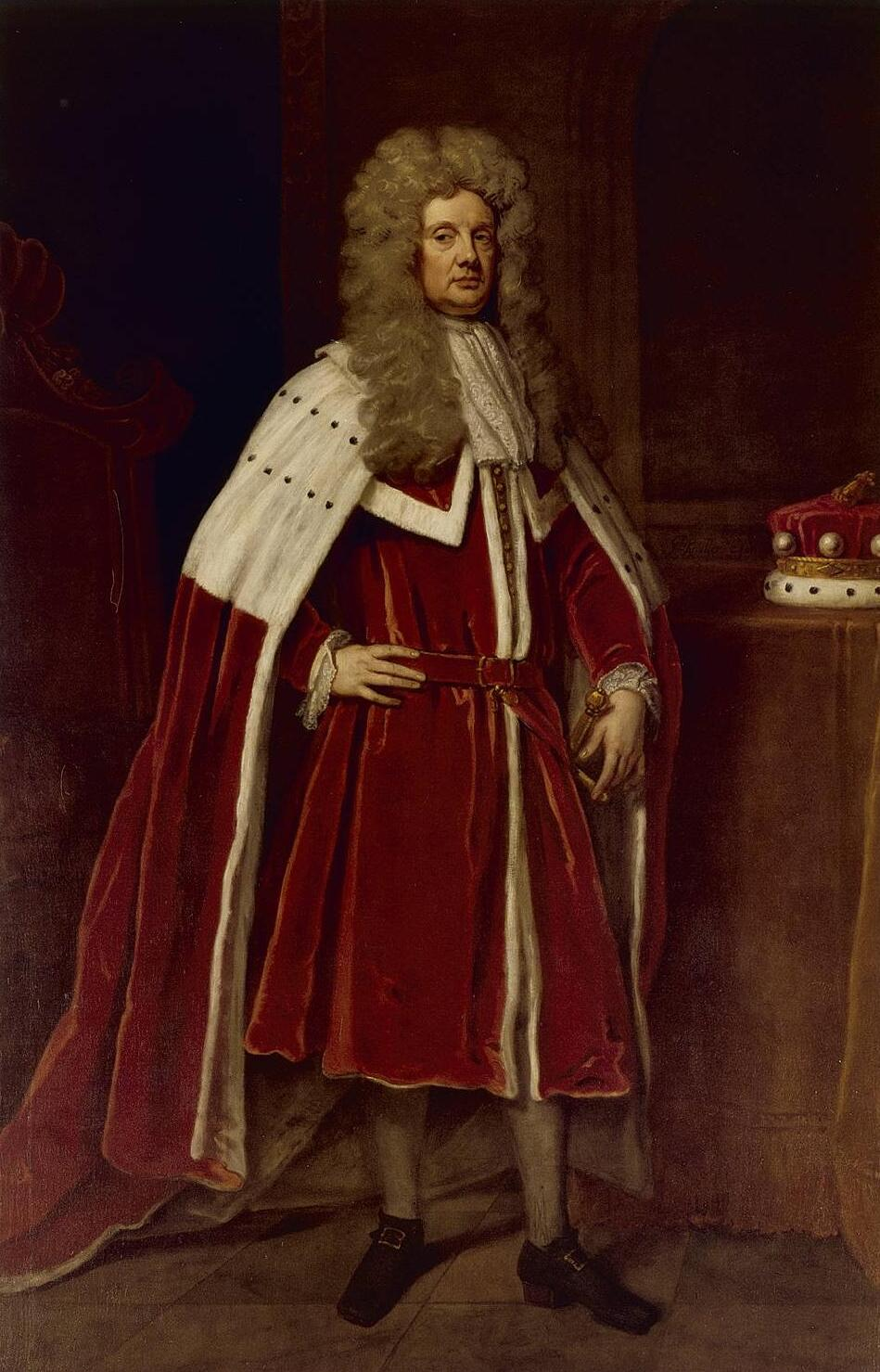
Charles Calvert, 3rd Lord Baltimore (1637–1714)

About this time Josias had also become influential in northern Virginia among sympathizers of Nathaniel Bacon and associated with John Coode Jr. (c. 1648–1709), who a few years later was the principal leader in the overthrow of the proprietary government. Josias had heard that the Papists (Roman Catholics) and Indians were joining to battle with the Protestants. This was confirmed by Capt. John Dent Sr., Gent. (c. 1645–1712). He claimed that Lord Baltimore was responsible, and wanted to destroy all the Protestants. The massacre of five men and a woman at St. Mary's was pointed to as evidence that Lord Baltimore's policy toward the Indians was adequate. Fendall gathered planters in Charles County, to discuss these rumors, which coupled with the fear of the Indian raids that had engulfed their neighbors in Stafford County, Virginia, this developed into a panic. The Governor assured them that all the Indians in the area had recently signed treaties of peace. However, the days when isolated settlers fell to the tomahawk lived in their recollections as a reality more potent than paper with marks, or tokens. The threat of the Indians remained a factor in the suspicions directed toward Lord Baltimore and his administration. As a result, it is said that Fendall and Coode organized troops to stop Lord Baltimore.

Fendall and Coode visited Nicholas Spencer Jr., Esq. (died 1689), the Secretary of Virginia and no great friend of Charles Calvert. Spencer advised them to forego any active role at this time, and to let the Catholics alone. Nevertheless, rumors circulated that in 1681, Fendall and Coode had planned to move their families temporarily to Virginia. Upon hearing this, Lord Baltimore had them arrested. It was said that they were arrested "in their own houses at dead of night in time of peace with force of arms and without warrants shown". Authorities apparently freed Coode on bail within five days, but Fendall remained in custody. It is very doubtful that a rebellion was actually under way. Virginia observers felt that Lord Baltimore's charges against the two men were unsupported and "of little weight". Some suggested that the arrests were merely one attempt to prevent participation by either Coode or Fendall in the upcoming session of the Assembly, which already promised to be a heated confrontation over defense policies.

Josias was under guard at Mattaponi, near Nottingham in today's Prince George's County, in July 1681 by the sheriff Col. Henry Darnall Sr. (1645–1711), the owner. This estate was later owned by the Marburys, who were descendants of Fendall. Fendall was tried on November 15, by the Catholic Court, dominated by the Calverts. For fear that Fendall would have time to influence the people who charged him, he was not allowed by the courts to enquire into the evidence of his crime. He was allowed to screen the jurors, in which he dismissed the Catholics and retained the Protestants. In the hearing, he was found guilty of attempting to raise a mutiny in Charles County and sedition through the utterance of "malicious words against the government".

During the sentence the Assembly notified that with the severity of the offense the law would allow for the "boaring of the tongue, cropping one or both ears, and other corporal punishments". However they decided to take a more moderate and less shameful way of punishment and fined him 40,000 pounds of tobacco, and banished from the province. His associate John Coode was acquitted, and given the advice to "keepe a Guard upon your Tongue". Another Fendall partisan, Lt. George Godfrey, a court justice and militia officer in a troop of horse of Capt. Randolph Brandt I (died 1714), of Charles County, did not fare quite as well. Godfrey had attempted to organize a troop "to rescue and sett at large" Fendall while he was in jail awaiting trial. Capt. Brandt, a Catholic, informed Lord Baltimore of the plot. The jury sentenced Godfrey to "be hanged by the neck until he be dead". A week later Charles, 3rd Lord Baltimore, commuted the sentence to life imprisonment.

John Pendleton Kennedy (1795–1870) wrote an account of the events leading up to and including this trial in his historical romance novel Rob of the Bowl. Although using much authentic data, Kennedy added to the events much melodrama and speculation that were unfounded.

In 1682 Fendall was a resident in Virginia, in a portion of Virginia which later became part of Perquimans County, North Carolina. It was found that he was stirring up another rebellion there. Two years later on June 26, 1684, it was reported that he was on the London ship, Margarett, captained by Edward Watkins, in the Potomac River and a warrant was issued for his arrest, but he was not found. Here the record of his career closes. It is possible that he fled, possibly even along with his wife Mary and started a second family in Virginia or North Carolina. The name of Mary Fendall, his widow and administratrix, appears in court records in 1688. Mary was in or near James City, York Co., Virginia on May 14, 1688. On June 10, 1690, she applied for administration upon the estate. According to her petition, Josias had died intestate (without a will). (Excerpts taken from several sources including: National Encyclopedia of Americana, Archives of Maryland, and several additional records).

== Land holdings ==
Fendall's house was located on the west side of the Wicomico River, near Allens Fresh, Charles Co., Maryland. (Wicomico came from the Indian words Wicko, for house, and Mekee, for building.) It had a field in front of it, which was large enough for a troop of 36 mounted horses in a two-file formation. Nearby was Fendall's cow pen. He kept horses and cows. His mark for hogs and cattle was a "cropt on the left ear, and under keeled on the right ear", entered into the Charles Co., court record June 3, 1658. The house was at least two stories high, and large enough to hold court, which it did several times. It had a fireside where people could sit and talk. He had several servants that lived on his plantation. In 1681 Josias sold a boat that was at least large enough to carry a man, wife, and four children.

Fendall had several land holdings. One of these land ownings was named "Cool Spring Manor" or "Cold Springs Manor". This estate was located on the west side of the Patuxent River in Mt. Calvert Hundred, Calvert Co., Maryland, which is now part of Patuxent Hundred, Prince George's Co., Maryland, near the present day University of Maryland, College Park campus. It included 1050 acres (4.2 km^{2}). Josias obtained this property on July 2, 1649, for "good faithful services", and it was laid out May 27, 1657, and granted September 25, 1658.

This manor came with all the rights and privileges of the "Lord of a Manor" in England. The Maryland Manor was based upon the English system of land tenure, with the Lord of the manor and a tenancy of planters and farmers dependent on him. In addition to the land that the Lord owned, it also provided the owner with rights of government which the Lord possessed over his tenants, and they over one another. His wealth as a large landholder gave him considerable prestige, but his judicial dignity and authorities added other invisible qualities to his position in the Province. The baronial court decided all disputes between the Lord and his tenants concerning such matters as rents or trespass or escheats. The Lords of the Manor like all subjects of the Province subscribed to an oath of allegiance to the Lord Proprietary, and in turn the residents swore fealty to the Lord of the manor. Therefore, oaths of fidelity of the Manor Lords to Baltimore were sufficient evidence of loyalty to England.

Fendall sold Cool Spring Manor on May 10, 1677, to Maj. John Douglas Sr. (1636–1677) of Charles Co., Maryland for 22,000 pounds of tobacco.

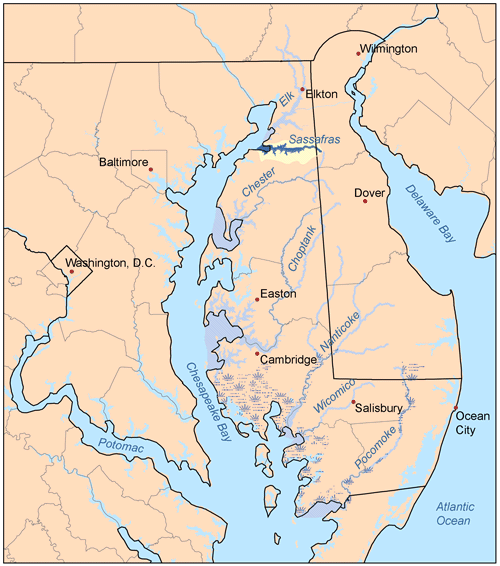
Map of the rivers of the Eastern Shore of Maryland with the Sassafras and its watershed highlighted.

The other land holding that Fendall owned was called Great Oak Manor, in Kent County. This tract was laid out on August 16, 1658, and granted February 28, 1659. Fendall was awarded this land with Court Baron only. Great Oak Manor was located south of the Sassafras River mouth, where Steel Bone Creek flows into a small bay. In the early records this creek was Steepone Creek and the bay was Steepone Bay, both mentioned in records of 1659. The modern form StillPond Creek is of later origin. Churn Creek, lying near Steelpone, is shown by the early mapmaker Augustine Herrman (1605–1686), but left unnamed. It often appears in the land records from 1661 onward. South of Steelpone Bay appears Beacon Bay, more often called Bacon Bay in early deeds. Development began here in 1658 when Gov. Fendall and Captain Cornwallis took up lands on its shores. On the south side of the bay is Beacon Creek. Here Gov. Josias Fendall took up his 2,000 acre (8 km^{2}) Great Oak Manor, which apparently was referring to a large oak tree on an oyster shell bank which marked the southwest corner of the property. In 1658 and thereafter the deed records use the name Fendall's Creek for the stream. But Fendall fell into political disgrace in 1659 when he headed a revolt against the proprietor. The careful Herrman therefore prefers to call this stream Beacon Creek. South from Beacon Creek is Farlo Creek, now called Farley or Fairlee Creek." ("Notes on Augustine Herrman's Map", Maryland Historical Magazine.)

In describing Great Oak Manor, the following description was used: "Lying on the east side of Chesapeake Bay and on the south side of a bay in the said bay called Bacon Bay beginning at a marked oake by the creeke side running for bredth north north west to the mouth of Bacon Bay two hundred twenty and five perches and south south west down Chesapeake Bay to a marked oake by a creeke called Fendall's Creeke 635 perches bounding on the south by a line drawn east from the said oake 500 perches on the east by a line drawn north from the end of the east line 500 perches on the north by a line drawn west from the end of the north line 150 perches to the first marked oake containing and laid out for 2,000 acres (8.1 km^{2}) [8 km²] more or less".

Fendall's family never resided personally at Great Oak Manor, although he succeeded in clearing the forests to cultivate tobacco there.

== See also ==
- List of colonial governors of Maryland
- Province of Maryland
