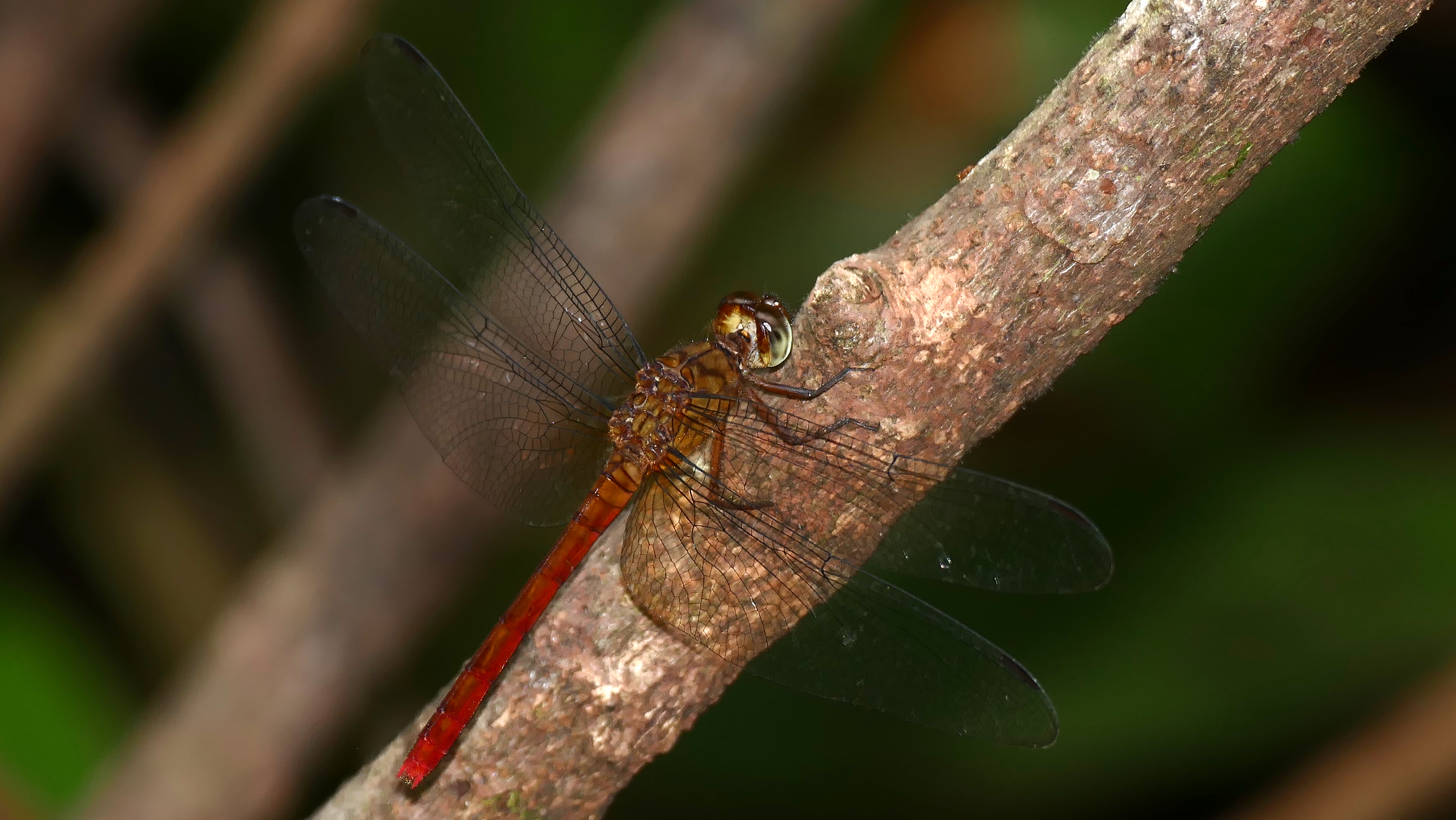
- Cardinal Redskimmer (Rhodopygia cardinalis) in French Guiana

Scientific classification
- Kingdom: Animalia
- Phylum: Arthropoda
- Clade: Pancrustacea
- Class: Insecta
- Order: Odonata
- Infraorder: Anisoptera
- Family: Libellulidae
- Genus: Rhodopygia; Kirby, 1889

= Rhodopygia =

Genus of dragonflies

Rhodopygia is a genus of dragonflies in the family Libellulidae. They are neotropical species, occurring in Guatemala, Belize through Bolivia and Brazil.

== Species ==
The genus contains the following species:

Male	Female	Scientific name	Common name	Distribution
		Rhodopygia cardinalis (Erichson, 1848)	Cardinal Redskimmer	South America
		Rhodopygia geijskesi Belle, 1964		Brazil to Venezuela
		Rhodopygia hinei Calvert, 1907		Panamá, Costa Rica, Guatemala
		Rhodopygia hollandi Calvert, 1907	Slender Redskimmer	Brazil, Suriname, Venezuela
		Rhodopygia pruinosa Buchholz, 1953		Brazil, Suriname, French Guiana
