= Chalcothore =

Scientific classification
- Kingdom: Animalia
- Phylum: Arthropoda
- Clade: Pancrustacea
- Class: Insecta
- Order: Odonata
- Suborder: Zygoptera
- Family: Polythoridae
- Genus: Chalcothore; De Marmels, 1988

Genus of damselflies

Chalcothore is a genus of damselfly in family Polythoridae. It contains the following species:

- Chalcothore montgomeryi (Rácenis, 1968)
