= Stenocora =

Conservation status
- Near Threatened (IUCN 3.1)

Scientific classification
- Kingdom: Animalia
- Phylum: Arthropoda
- Class: Insecta
- Order: Odonata
- Suborder: Zygoptera
- Family: Polythoridae
- Genus: Stenocora; Kennedy, 1940
- Species: S. percornuta

Binomial name
- Stenocora percornuta Kennedy, 1940

Genus of damselflies

Stenocora is a monotypic genus of damselflies in the family Polythoridae, the bannerwings. It contains the single species Stenocora percornuta, which is known commonly as the horned bannerwing. It is native to Ecuador and Peru. Little is known about the species.
