= Cora (damselfly) =

Scientific classification
- Kingdom: Animalia
- Phylum: Arthropoda
- Clade: Pancrustacea
- Class: Insecta
- Order: Odonata
- Suborder: Zygoptera
- Family: Polythoridae
- Genus: Cora; Selys, 1853

Species
- see text

Synonyms
- Kalocora

Genus of damselflies

Cora is a genus of damselflies in the family Polythoridae, the bannerwings. In a 1990 revision there were 18 species.

Species include:

- Cora aurea
- Cora chiribiquete
- Cora chirripa
- Cora confusa
- Cora cyane
- Cora dorada
- Cora dualis
- Cora inca
- Cora irene
- Cora jocosa
- Cora klenei
- Cora lugubris
- Cora marina
- Cora modesta
- Cora munda
- Cora notoxantha
- Cora obscura
- Cora parda
- Cora semiopaca
- Cora skinneri
- Cora terminalis
- Cora xanthostoma
