= Phillip Calvert (governor) =

Colonial Governor of Maryland

5th Proprietary-Governor of Maryland
- In office 1660–1661
- Preceded by: Josias Fendall
- Succeeded by: Charles Calvert

Personal details
- Born: c. 1626 England
- Died: c. December 22, 1682 (aged 55–56) Maryland Colony
- Cause of death: Heart attack
- Resting place: "Chapel Field", St. Mary's City, Maryland
- Spouse(s): Anne Wolsely; Jane Sewell
- Parent(s): George Calvert, 1st Baron Baltimore; Joane Calvert
- Occupation: Politician

Hon. Phillip Calvert (c. 1626 - c. December 22, 1682), also known as Hon. Philip Calvert, was the fifth governor of Maryland during a brief period in 1660 or 1661. He was appointed by the royally chartered proprietor of Maryland, Charles Calvert, 3rd Baron Baltimore (1637–1715), as a caretaker to replace Lt. Gen Josias Fendall (1628–1682), the fifth/sixth? provincial governor.

== Life ==
Calvert came to Maryland on the first expedition under the first colonial governor Leonard Calvert (1606–1647), younger brother of the second Lord Baltimore Cecilius Calvert, 2nd Baron Baltimore (1605–1675). In 1656, he was made secretary of the Province and one of its Councillors. After the treason and overthrow of Governor Fendall, Calvert became governor in 1660, and displayed clemency in pardoning Fendall.

In 1659, at the extreme southern point of Talbot County, Maryland, 1000 acres of land was surveyed for Calvert.

In 1661, Capt. Charles Calvert (1688–1734), illegitimate son of the Proprietor, was made Governor, and Philip was appointed Deputy-Lieutenant and Councillor of the Province. After this, he negotiated a treaty with the Dutch in which they agreed to abandon the disputed territory on the Delaware River. He was one of a committee which negotiated a treaty with the Indians, and of another commission which settled with the Virginia authorities a boundary line between Maryland and Virginia along the south shore of the Potomac River.

On 27 June 1662, Phillip Calvert was part of the council that ordered a prison be constructed, with "...the charges to be defrayed according to the law of England." One of Calvert's responsibilities was to bear witness to the writing and signing of the last will and testaments of residents.

== Family ==
He was son of George Calvert, first Lord Baltimore (1579–1632), and his second wife, Joane.

Calvert was married to Anne Wolsely Calvert. She died in 1680. He remarried to Jane Sewell Calvert, the step-daughter of his nephew Charles Calvert, 3rd Baron Baltimore. In 1682, Jane gave birth to a child of unknown name and gender. Philip Calvert and the infant both died in 1682.

== Burial ==
It is believed Calvert was embalmed, with his organs removed from his skull and torso, and then the cavities filled with a mixture of salt, a white powder called alum, lime (a substance found in certain types of rock), and herbs. He was placed in a wooden hexagonally shaped coffin made from several kinds of wood, the wooden coffin was then wrapped in two sheets of lead that had been shaped to fit together much like a shoebox.

== Discovery of remains ==
In August 1990, ground-penetrating radar was being used in Historic St. Mary's City at the dig site of the colonial church. The radar which was used to map disturbed earth under the chapel floor uncovered an extremely dense object, believed to be the lead coffin of Phillip Calvert. "It could be something natural, like a rock," said Henry Miller chief archaeologist for Historic Saint Mary's City. "We're not going to dig it up," said another archaeologist Timothy B. Riordan. "We're going to excavate just enough to find out what it is. But we'll conveniently excavate that portion where there might be a name plate."

On Tuesday, 4 December 1990, after digging for a week, archaeologists unearthed three gray lead coffins buried about three feet deep. It was immediately believed the coffins were that of the Calvert family. "He is the one man who died in Maryland, of sufficient wealth and stature - and a Catholic - to be buried in the church, and in a lead coffin," Miller said. "With three of them here, we suspect this is the Calvert family crypt in Maryland."

In 1990, the bodies of Phillip Calvert, Anne Wolsely Calvert, and the infant were found in lead coffins in a brick vault located in the ruins of a brick chapel in the "Chapel Field" in St. Mary's City, Maryland, the former colonial capital. Examination of these remains provided scientists and historians with significant insight regarding life in 17th century Maryland.

On 19 March 2016, the three lead coffins were reinterred in the recreated chapel built on the site of the original. The coffins were placed in the exact spot they were originally excavated. DNA analysis in October 2016 showed the male adult and the infant have a father-son relationship, verifying the infant as a child of Phillip Calvert. The baby is assessed to have died about three months after his father, in the spring of 1683, judging by the pine and oak pollen in the coffin.

The human remains were reinterred to chapel grounds on September 20, 2025.

== See also ==
- List of colonial governors of Maryland

== Bibliography ==
- Walker, Sally M. (2009). Written In Bone: Buried Lives of Jamestown and Colonial Maryland. Minneapolis, Minnesota: Carolrhoda Books. ISBN 978-0-8225-7135-3.
