= Philip Powell Calvert =

American entomologist (1871–1961)

Philip Powell Calvert in 1935

Philip Powell Calvert (January 29, 1871, in Philadelphia, Pennsylvania – August 23, 1961) was an American entomologist, recognised as a leading authority on the Odonata (dragonfly order).

A long-term teacher and professor at the University of Pennsylvania, he was President of the American Entomological Society 1900-15. He was elected to the American Philosophical Society in 1918. His 1893 publication Catalogue of the Odonata (dragonflies) of the Vicinity of Philadelphia, with an Introduction to the Study of this Group served as a model for regional insect study and was the first major attempt at a guide to the order. Calvert went on to publish over 300 notes and articles on the Odonata. He was married to botanist Amelia Smith Calvert.
