= Tatocnemidoidea =

- Protolestes kerckhoffae male Ifanadiana, Madagascar

Scientific classification
- Kingdom: Animalia
- Phylum: Arthropoda
- Clade: Pancrustacea
- Class: Insecta
- Order: Odonata
- Suborder: Zygoptera
- Superfamily: Tatocnemidoidea; Racenis, 1959

Families
- Pentaphlebiidae; Protolestidae; Tatocnemididae
- Distribution of Tatocnemidoidea

Superfamily of damselflies

Tatocnemidoidea is a superfamily of damselflies comprising the families Pentaphlebiidae, Protolestidae and Tatocnemididae. Together they include three genera and 21 recognised species distributed in Madagascar and tropical west-central Africa.

Members of the superfamily inhabit forest streams. Although differing in appearance, the three families represent an ancient evolutionary lineage that was formerly included within the broadly defined family Megapodagrionidae before being recognised as distinct through molecular phylogenetic studies.

Tatocnemis malgassica male, Madagascar

== Taxonomic history ==
The genera now placed in Tatocnemidoidea were formerly included within the broadly defined family Megapodagrionidae, which molecular phylogenetic studies showed to comprise several unrelated evolutionary lineages.

Subsequent phylogenomic analyses supported recognition of Tatocnemididae, Pentaphlebiidae and Protolestidae as separate families, and in 2026, Carter and colleagues placed them together in the superfamily Tatocnemidoidea.

== Phylogeny ==
- Zygoptera
  - Lestoidea
  - - Platystictoidea
    - - Priscagrionoidea
      - - - Tatocnemidoidea
          - Polythoroidea
        - - - Mesopodagrionoidea
            - - Amphipterygoidea
              - Euphaeoidea
          - - - Philogangoidea
              - - Megapodagrionoidea
                - Calopterygoidea
            - Coenagrionoidea

Relationships among living damselfly superfamilies, based on Carter et al. (2026).

== Families ==
The superfamily comprises three monogeneric families:

- Pentaphlebiidae Novelo-Gutiérrez, 1995
- Protolestidae Dijkstra & Bybee, 2021
- Tatocnemididae Racenis, 1959

== Etymology ==
The superfamily name Tatocnemidoidea is derived from the type genus Tatocnemis, with the standard zoological superfamily suffix -oidea.

The genus name Tatocnemis is of uncertain derivation. The suffix -cnemis is from the Greek κνήμη (knēmē, "leg" or "shin"), a component used in several related damselfly genus names such as Priocnemis and Idiocnemis. Kirby did not explain the origin of the prefix Tato- when he established the genus in 1889.
