= Heteropodagrion croizati =

Conservation status
- Least Concern (IUCN 3.1)

Scientific classification
- Kingdom: Animalia
- Phylum: Arthropoda
- Clade: Pancrustacea
- Class: Insecta
- Order: Odonata
- Suborder: Zygoptera
- Family: Heteragrionidae
- Genus: Heteropodagrion
- Species: H. croizati

Binomial name
- Heteropodagrion croizati Peréz-Gutierrez & Montes-Fontalvo, 2011

Species of damselfly

Heteropodagrion croizati is a species of damselfly in the family Heteragrionidae.

The IUCN conservation status of Heteropodagrion croizati is "LC", least concern, with no immediate threat to the species' survival. The IUCN status was reviewed in 2016.
