= Heteragrion freddiemercuryi =

Scientific classification
- Kingdom: Animalia
- Phylum: Arthropoda
- Clade: Pancrustacea
- Class: Insecta
- Order: Odonata
- Suborder: Zygoptera
- Family: Heteragrionidae
- Genus: Heteragrion
- Species: H. freddiemercuryi

Binomial name
- Heteragrion freddiemercuryi Lencioni, 2013

Species of damselfly

Heteragrion freddiemercuryi is a species of damselfly in the family Heteragrionidae. It was described as a new species in 2013 by F. A. A. Lencioni. The eponym for the species name "freddiemercuryi" is Queen frontman Freddie Mercury. Of naming the species after Mercury, Lencioni wrote, "I name this species after Freddie Mercury, artistic name of Farrokh Bulsara (1946–1991), superb and gifted musician and songwriter whose wonderful voice and talent still entertain millions of people around the world."

In the same publication, Lencioni described three more species of damselfly in the genus Heteragrion after three other members of Queen: H. brianmayi (Brian May), H. rogertaylori (Roger Taylor), and H. johndeaconi (John Deacon). Naming four new species after members of the band was done to pay tribute to the 40th anniversary of its founding. However, this is slightly inaccurate as the band was founded in 1971; nonetheless, the band’s first album was released in 1973.

== See also ==
- Cirolana mercuryi
- Mercurana
- List of organisms named after famous people (born 1925–1949)
