= Heteropodagrion sanguinipes =

Conservation status
- Least Concern (IUCN 3.1)

Scientific classification
- Kingdom: Animalia
- Phylum: Arthropoda
- Clade: Pancrustacea
- Class: Insecta
- Order: Odonata
- Suborder: Zygoptera
- Family: Heteragrionidae
- Genus: Heteropodagrion
- Species: H. sanguinipes

Binomial name
- Heteropodagrion sanguinipes Selys, 1895

Species of damselfly

Heteropodagrion sanguinipes is a species of damselfly in the family Heteragrionidae. It is found in South America.

The IUCN conservation status of Heteropodagrion sanguinipes is "LC", least concern, with no immediate threat to the species' survival. The IUCN status was reviewed in 2016.
