= Philosina alba =

Conservation status
- Vulnerable (IUCN 3.1)

Scientific classification
- Kingdom: Animalia
- Phylum: Arthropoda
- Clade: Pancrustacea
- Class: Insecta
- Order: Odonata
- Suborder: Zygoptera
- Family: Philosinidae
- Genus: Philosina
- Species: P. alba

Binomial name
- Philosina alba Wilson, 1999

Species of damselfly

Philosina alba, the milky flatwing, is a species of damselfly in the family Philosinidae.

The IUCN conservation status of Philosina alba is "VU", vulnerable. The species faces a high risk of endangerment in the medium term.
