= Oxystigma =

Oxystigma is the scientific name of two genera of organisms and may refer to:

- Oxystigma (damselfly), a genus of insects in the family Heteragrionidae
- Oxystigma (plant), a genus of plants in the family Fabaceae
