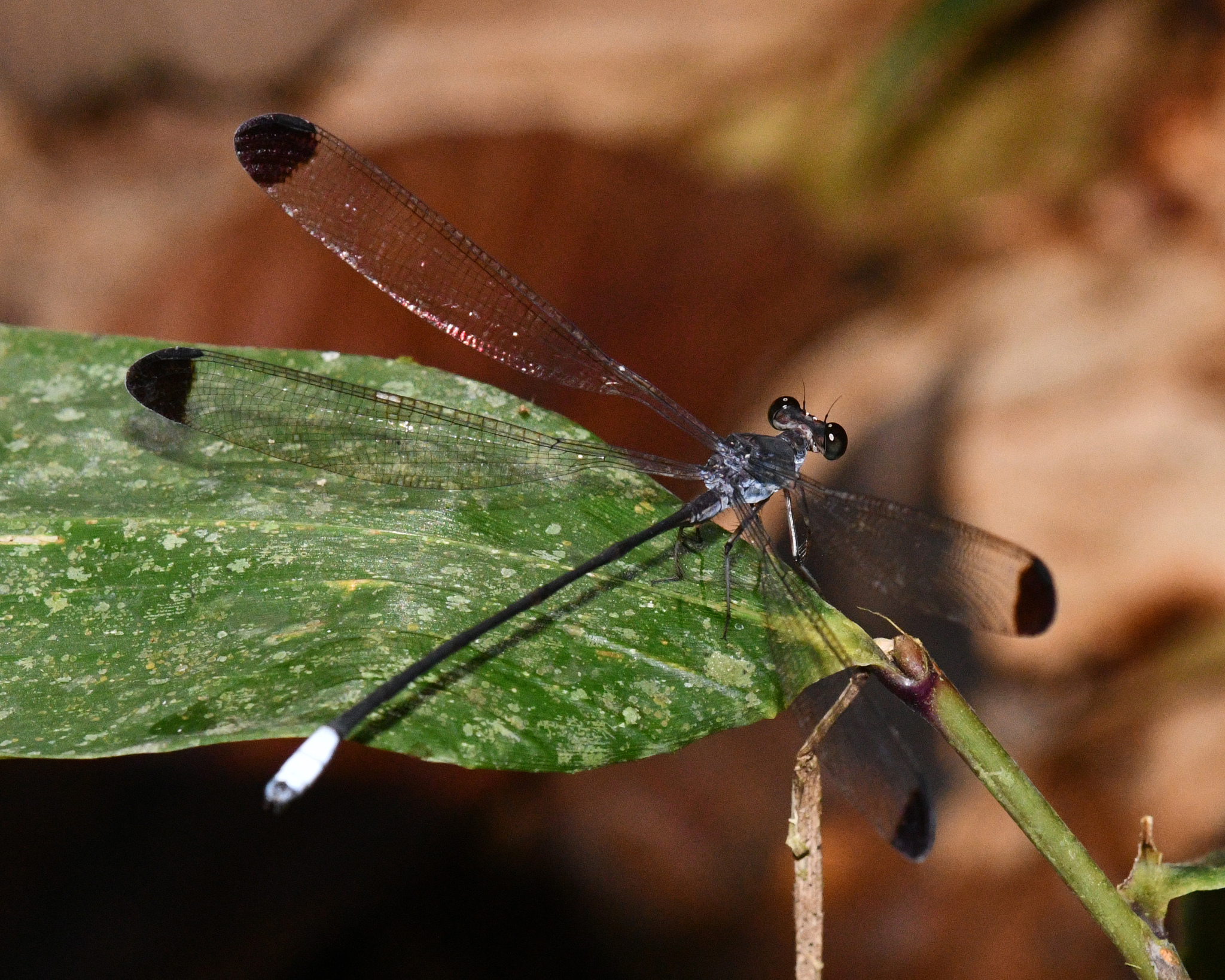
- Philogenia elisabeta

Scientific classification
- Kingdom: Animalia
- Phylum: Arthropoda
- Clade: Pancrustacea
- Class: Insecta
- Order: Odonata
- Suborder: Zygoptera
- Superfamily: Polythoroidea
- Family: Philogeniidae
- Genus: Philogenia; Selys, 1862

= Philogenia =

Genus of damselflies

Philogenia is a genus of damselflies in the family Philogeniidae. Species of the genus are found in tropical Central and South America, and inhabit forest streams.

== Description ==
Species of the genus Philogenia are medium-sized to large damselflies that inhabit forest streams. Adults are usually dark in colour with yellow, blue or green markings and typically perch with their wings held open. The wings are long and narrow, often clear but sometimes darkened towards the tips, and have a distinctive fine network of veins near the outer margins.

== Taxonomy ==
The genus Philogenia was erected by Edmond de Sélys Longchamps in 1862. It was historically included within the family Megapodagrionidae and later formed the basis of the tribe Philogeniini established by Janis Rácenis in 1959. Molecular studies subsequently showed that Philogenia and Archaeopodagrion form a distinct lineage of damselflies, now recognised as the family Philogeniidae.

== Species ==
The following species are currently placed in Philogenia:

- Philogenia augusti Calvert, 1924
- Philogenia berenice Higgins, 1901
- Philogenia boliviana Bick & Bick, 1988
- Philogenia buenavista Bick & Bick, 1988
- Philogenia carrillica Calvert, 1907
- Philogenia cassandra Hagen in Selys, 1862
- Philogenia championi Calvert, 1901
- Philogenia compressa Dunkle, 1990
- Philogenia cristalina Calvert, 1924
- Philogenia ebona Dunkle, 1986
- Philogenia elisabeta Calvert, 1924
- Philogenia expansa Calvert, 1924
- Philogenia ferox Rácenis, 1959
- Philogenia gaiae Vilela & Cordero-Rivera, 2019
- Philogenia helena Hagen, 1869
- Philogenia iquita Dunkle, 1990
- Philogenia lankesteri Calvert, 1924
- Philogenia leonora Westfall & Cumming, 1956
- Philogenia macuma Dunkle, 1986
- Philogenia mangosisa Bick & Bick, 1988
- Philogenia margarita Selys, 1862
- Philogenia marinasilva Machado, 2010
- Philogenia martae Bota-Sierra, 2017
- Philogenia minteri Dunkle, 1986
- Philogenia monotis (Kennedy, 1941)
- Philogenia nemesioi Machado, 2013
- Philogenia peacocki Brooks, 1989
- Philogenia peruviana Bick & Bick, 1988
- Philogenia polyxena Calvert, 1924
- Philogenia raphaella Selys, 1886
- Philogenia realpei Cano-Cobos & Bota-Sierra, 2023
- Philogenia redunca Cook, 1989
- Philogenia schmidti Ris, 1918
- Philogenia silvarum Ris, 1918
- Philogenia strigilis Donnelly, 1989
- Philogenia sucra Dunkle, 1986
- Philogenia terraba Calvert, 1907
- Philogenia umbrosa Ris, 1918
- Philogenia zeteki Westfall & Cumming, 1956

== Etymology ==
The genus name Philogenia is probably derived from the Greek φίλος (philos, "loving", "fond of" or "friend") and γένος (genos, "kind", "race" or "lineage"). Sélys did not explain the derivation and its intended meaning remains uncertain.

== See also ==
- Philogeniidae
