= Heteragrion tricellulare =

Conservation status
- Least Concern (IUCN 3.1)

Scientific classification
- Kingdom: Animalia
- Phylum: Arthropoda
- Clade: Pancrustacea
- Class: Insecta
- Order: Odonata
- Suborder: Zygoptera
- Family: Heteragrionidae
- Genus: Heteragrion
- Species: H. tricellulare

Binomial name
- Heteragrion tricellulare Calvert, 1901

Species of damselfly

Heteragrion tricellulare is a species of damselfly in the family Heteragrionidae. It is found in Guatemala and Mexico. Its natural habitats are subtropical or tropical moist montane forests and rivers. It is threatened by habitat loss.
