= Tatocnemis =

- Tatocnemis malgassica male in Madagascar

Scientific classification
- Kingdom: Animalia
- Phylum: Arthropoda
- Clade: Pancrustacea
- Class: Insecta
- Order: Odonata
- Suborder: Zygoptera
- Superfamily: Tatocnemidoidea
- Family: Tatocnemididae; Rácenis, 1959
- Genus: Tatocnemis; Kirby, 1889
- Distribution of Tatocnemis

Genus of insects

Tatocnemis is the sole genus of damselflies in the family Tatocnemididae, one of three families in the superfamily Tatocnemidoidea. The genus occurs on Madagascar and neighbouring islands and contains ten described species.

Species of Tatocnemis inhabit forest streams and are characterised by their slender bodies, wings with a narrow stalk at the base, and large pterostigmata. Several species have distinctive wing shapes, including wing tips with a shallow notch.

== Family classification ==
Kirby established the genus Tatocnemis in 1889 for Tatocnemis malgassica from Madagascar. He considered it a highly distinctive genus because of its wing structure, noting similarities to a small number of unusual damselfly genera from the Philippines and New Guinea.

In a revision of Megapodagrionidae, Rácenis (1959) established Tatocnemidinae as a new subfamily containing Tatocnemis and Archaeopodagrion. Subsequent morphological and molecular studies supported recognition of this lineage as distinct from Megapodagrionidae.

Modern classifications recognise Tatocnemididae as a separate family of damselflies. The family contains only the genus Tatocnemis and its ten described species.

In 2026, Carter and colleagues recognised Tatocnemididae, Pentaphlebiidae and Protolestidae as the superfamily Tatocnemidoidea, based on phylogenomic studies that resolved the three families as a distinct lineage of damselflies.

== Species ==
The following species are currently placed in Tatocnemis:

- Tatocnemis crenulatipennis Fraser, 1952
- Tatocnemis denticularis Aguesse, 1968
- Tatocnemis emarginatipennis Fraser, 1960
- Tatocnemis malgassica Kirby, 1889
- Tatocnemis mellisi Schmidt, 1951
- Tatocnemis micromalgassica Aguesse, 1968
- Tatocnemis olsufieffi Schmidt, 1951
- Tatocnemis robinsoni Schmidt, 1951
- Tatocnemis sinuatipennis (Selys, 1891)
- Tatocnemis virginiae Legrand, 1992

== Etymology ==
The family name Tatocnemididae is derived from the type genus Tatocnemis, with the standard zoological family suffix -idae.

The genus name Tatocnemis is of uncertain derivation. The suffix -cnemis is from the Greek κνήμη (knēmē, "leg" or "shin"), a component used in several related damselfly genus names such as Priocnemis and Idiocnemis. Kirby did not explain the origin of the prefix Tato- when he established the genus in 1889.
