= Heteragrion eboratum =

Conservation status
- Near Threatened (IUCN 3.1)

Scientific classification
- Kingdom: Animalia
- Phylum: Arthropoda
- Clade: Pancrustacea
- Class: Insecta
- Order: Odonata
- Suborder: Zygoptera
- Family: Heteragrionidae
- Genus: Heteragrion
- Species: H. eboratum

Binomial name
- Heteragrion eboratum Donnelly, 1965

Species of damselfly

Heteragrion eboratum is a species of damselfly in the family Heteragrionidae. It is found in Guatemala, Honduras, and Nicaragua. Its natural habitats are subtropical or tropical moist montane forests and rivers. It is threatened by habitat loss.
