= Heteragrion brianmayi =

Scientific classification
- Kingdom: Animalia
- Phylum: Arthropoda
- Clade: Pancrustacea
- Class: Insecta
- Order: Odonata
- Suborder: Zygoptera
- Family: Heteragrionidae
- Genus: Heteragrion
- Species: H. brianmayi

Binomial name
- Heteragrion brianmayi Lencioni, 2013

Species of damselfly

Heteragrion brianmayi is a species of damselfly in the family Heteragrionidae. It was described as a new species in 2013 by F. A. A. Lencioni. The eponym for the species name "brianmayi" is Queen lead guitarist Brian May.

In the same publication, Lencioni described three more species of damselfly in the genus Heteragrion after three other members of Queen: H. freddiemercuryi (Freddie Mercury), H. rogertaylori (Roger Taylor), and H. johndeaconi (John Deacon). Naming four new species after members of the band was done to pay tribute to the 40th anniversary of its founding.

== See also ==
- List of organisms named after famous people (born 1925–1949)
