= Heteropodagrion superbum =

Scientific classification
- Kingdom: Animalia
- Phylum: Arthropoda
- Clade: Pancrustacea
- Class: Insecta
- Order: Odonata
- Suborder: Zygoptera
- Family: Heteragrionidae
- Genus: Heteropodagrion
- Species: H. superbum

Binomial name
- Heteropodagrion superbum Ris, 1918

Species of damselfly

Heteropodagrion superbum is a species of damselfly in the family Heteragrionidae. It is found in Central America and South America.
