= Heteropodagrion =

Scientific classification
- Kingdom: Animalia
- Phylum: Arthropoda
- Clade: Pancrustacea
- Class: Insecta
- Order: Odonata
- Suborder: Zygoptera
- Superfamily: Polythoroidea
- Family: Heteragrionidae
- Genus: Heteropodagrion (Selys, 1885)

Genus of damselflies

Heteropodagrion is a genus of flatwings in the damselfly order Zygoptera, family Heteragrionidae. There are five described species in Heteropodagrion.

== Species ==
- Heteropodagrion croizati Peréz-Gutierrez & Montes-Fontalvo, 2011
- Heteropodagrion nigripes Daigle, 2014
- Heteropodagrion sanguinipes Selys, 1895
- Heteropodagrion superbum Ris, 1918
- Heteropodagrion varipes Daigle, 2014
