= Archaeopodagrion =

Scientific classification
- Kingdom: Animalia
- Phylum: Arthropoda
- Clade: Pancrustacea
- Class: Insecta
- Order: Odonata
- Suborder: Zygoptera
- Superfamily: Polythoroidea
- Family: Philogeniidae
- Genus: Archaeopodagrion; Kennedy, 1939

Genus of damselflies

Archaeopodagrion is a genus of damselflies in the family Philogeniidae. Species of Archaeopodagrion occur in Central and South America, where they inhabit forest streams.

== Description ==
Archaeopodagrion are slender forest damselflies with long legs and clear wings. They inhabit streams in tropical forests, where they perch on vegetation beside running water.

Males possess a distinctive pair of horn-like projections on the thorax behind the head. The wings are narrow and transparent, with relatively simple venation compared with many related damselflies.

== Distribution and habitat ==
Species of Archaeopodagrion inhabit forest streams in Central and South America. The type species, Archaeopodagrion bicorne, was described from small jungle streams in the Oriente region of eastern Ecuador.

== Taxonomy ==
Archaeopodagrion was described by Clarence Hamilton Kennedy in 1939 from specimens collected in eastern Ecuador. Kennedy regarded the genus as one of the most primitive members of Megapodagrioninae and considered it intermediate between Megapodagrion, Allopodagrion, Philogenia, Heteragrion and related Neotropical genera.

In discussing its relationships, Kennedy described Archaeopodagrion as "a Podagrion ghost out of the past", reflecting his view that the genus retained numerous ancestral features of the group.

The genus was subsequently included within Megapodagrionidae. Molecular phylogenetic studies later showed that Archaeopodagrion and Philogenia form a distinct lineage of damselflies, now recognised as the family Philogeniidae.

== Species ==
The following species are currently placed in Archaeopodagrion:

- Archaeopodagrion armatum Tennessen & Johnson, 2010
- Archaeopodagrion bicorne Kennedy, 1939
- Archaeopodagrion bilobatum Kennedy, 1946
- Archaeopodagrion fernandoi Bota-Sierra, 2017
- Archaeopodagrion mayi Amaya-Vallejo, Bota-Sierra, Novelo-Gutiérrez & Sánchez Herrera, 2021
- Archaeopodagrion oelmannae Bota-Sierra, 2025
- Archaeopodagrion recurvatum Amaya-Vallejo, Bota-Sierra, Novelo-Gutiérrez & Sánchez Herrera, 2021

== Etymology ==
The genus name Archaeopodagrion is derived from the Greek ἀρχαῖος (archaios, "ancient") and Podagrion, the former name of the genus now known as Megapodagrion. Kennedy explained the name as meaning "Ancient Podagrion", referring to what he considered the primitive nature of the genus.

== See also ==
- Philogeniidae
