= Philosina =

Scientific classification
- Kingdom: Animalia
- Phylum: Arthropoda
- Clade: Pancrustacea
- Class: Insecta
- Order: Odonata
- Suborder: Zygoptera
- Superfamily: Philogangoidea
- Family: Philosinidae
- Genus: Philosina; Ris, 1917
- Distribution of Philosina

Genus of damselflies

Philosina is a genus of damselflies in the family Philosinidae. The genus is found in eastern and southeastern Asia, where its species inhabit forest streams.

== Description ==
Philosina species are medium-sized to large damselflies with a robust body and long, narrow wings that are held open at rest. Adults are predominantly dark in colour with contrasting yellow, red or pale markings, and mature individuals may develop a bluish pruinosity on the thorax and abdomen.

In his original description, Ris noted that the general appearance of Philosina resembles that of the calopterygid genus Philoganga, although the wing venation differs markedly. The wings are densely veined, with numerous intercalated veins towards their tips, and are usually clear, although P. buchi has a diffuse dark patch near the wing apex.

== Taxonomic history ==
Ris established Philosina in 1917 for Philosina buchi, a species from Fujian Province in south-eastern China. He placed the genus within Selys' "Legion Podagrion", noting similarities to Philoganga, Mesopodagrion and other unusual damselflies then associated with that group.

During much of the twentieth century, Philosina was included within the broad family Megapodagrionidae. Molecular phylogenetic studies later showed that Megapodagrionidae, as traditionally defined, was not a natural group. As a result, Philosina and the related genus Rhinagrion are now placed in the family Philosinidae.

== Species ==
The following species are currently placed in Philosina:

- Philosina alba
- Philosina buchi
- Philosina nigromacula

== Etymology ==
Ris stated that the genus name Philosina was chosen because it recalls the related genus Philoganga, whose general appearance it resembles. The exact derivation of the name was not explained by the author.
