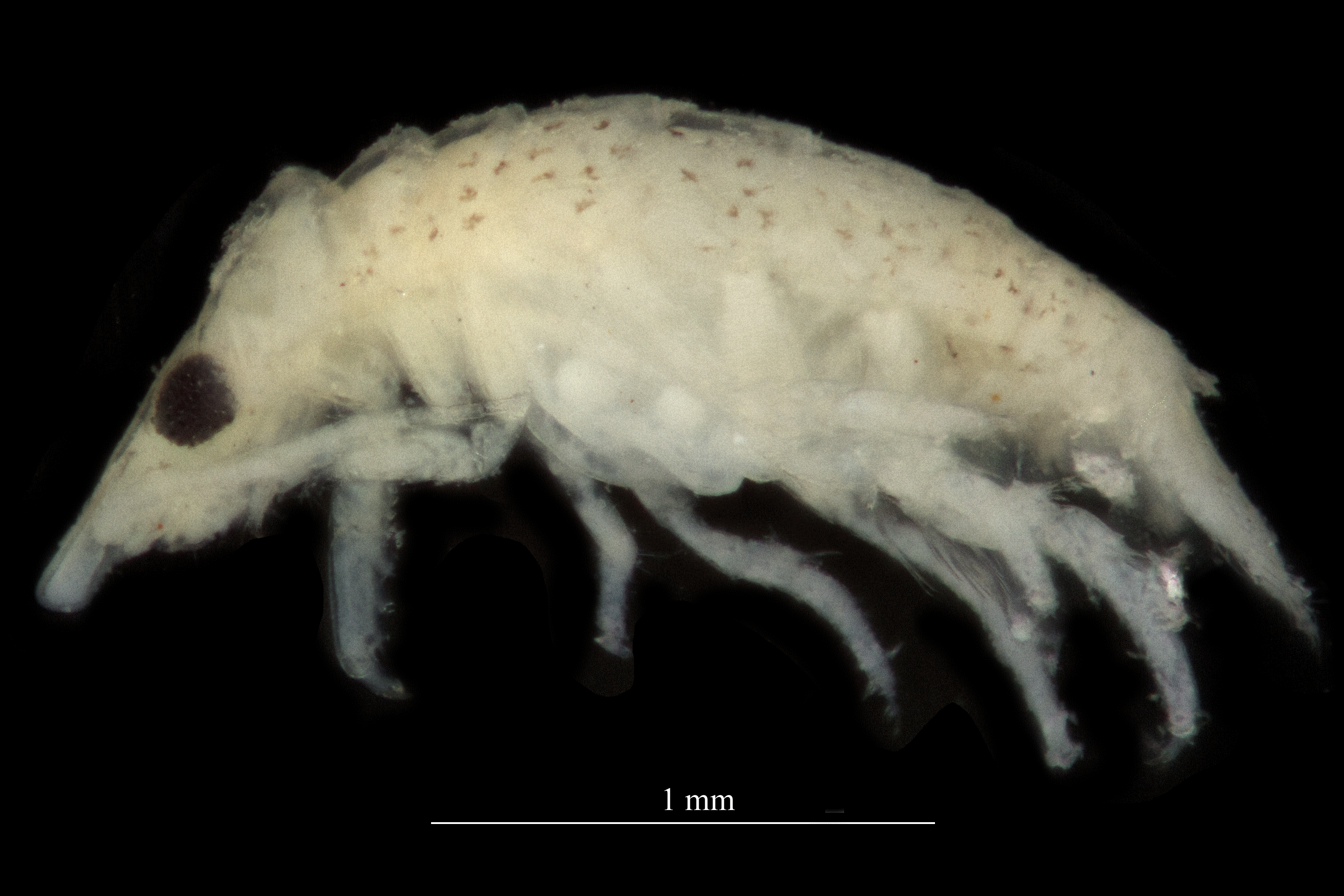

Scientific classification
- Kingdom: Animalia
- Phylum: Arthropoda
- Class: Malacostraca
- Order: Isopoda
- Family: Cirolanidae
- Genus: Cirolana
- Species: C. mercuryi

Binomial name
- Cirolana mercuryi Bruce, 2004

= Cirolana mercuryi =

Species of crustacean

Cirolana mercuryi is a species of isopod found on coral reefs off Bawe Island, (Zanzibar, Tanzania) in East Africa and named after Freddie Mercury, who was "[A]rguably Zanzibar's most famous popular musician and singer".

== See also ==
- Heteragrion freddiemercuryi
- Mercurana
- List of organisms named after famous people (born 1925–1949)
