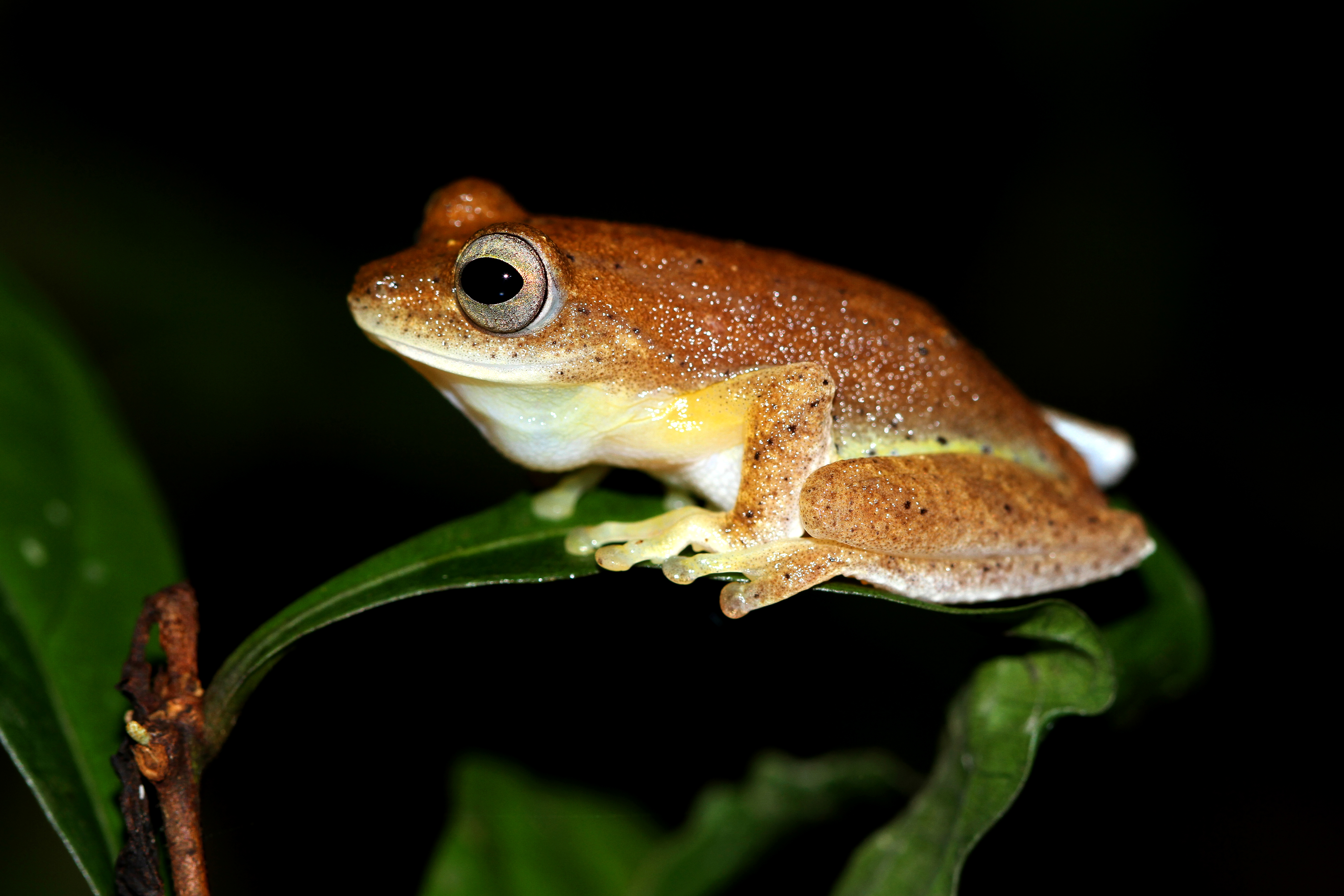
- Mercurana myristicapalustris

Scientific classification
- Kingdom: Animalia
- Phylum: Chordata
- Class: Amphibia
- Order: Anura
- Family: Rhacophoridae
- Genus: Mercurana; Abraham et al., 2013
- Species: M. myristicapalustris

Binomial name
- Mercurana myristicapalustris Abraham et al., 2013

= Mercurana =

Genus of amphibians

Mercurana is a genus of arboreal frogs belonging to the family Rhacophoridae. The genus was named from the only known species Mercurana myristicapalustris, which was described in 2013 from the Western Ghats of Kerala, India. The generic name was derived from and given as a tribute to Freddie Mercury, the late vocalist of the British rock band Queen, in combination with the Latin name for "frog" (Rana, which is also the name of the most common frog genus). The frog is different from other related frogs in that it has extensively webbed toes, lives only in swampy lowlands, and lays its eggs on mud with which it carefully mixes leaf litter.

== Discovery and etymology ==
The type species (holotype) of Mercurana was collected on 18 May 2012 from bushes at the periphery of a temple compound, Arippa, near Kulathupuzha Reserve Forest, Kollam district, Kerala, India. It was a single adult male. Other two adult males (paratypes) were found from the same locality on 12 July 2012. The formal description was published on 17 April 2013 in the journal Zootaxa. The generic name was derived from 'Mercury' as a tribute to Freddie Mercury, the late singer and lyricist of the British rock band Queen, in combination with the genus name Rana, the most common frog taxa. The scientists chose 'Mercury' because Mercury's "vibrant music was inspiring", in the author's own account. Further, Mercury was of Indian-Parsi origin and spent the majority of his childhood in Panchgani, which is located in the northern part of the mountain range from where the frog was discovered. The specific name is a combination of the words Myristica (a genus of the nutmeg family of trees), and palustris, which is Latin for "swampy", to indicate the swamp forest habitat dominantly represented by Myristica trees in which the frog lives. The forest is particularly noted for its fragile and threatened habitat type in the Western Ghats.

== Description ==
Mercurana are medium-sized frogs; males are smaller measuring 35 mm in length, while the female is up to 65 mm. They have a slender body which is rusty-brown in colour with small black speckles on the back. Females are more greenish-yellow in colour on the back. The dorsal surface of the skin is a rough shagreen. The ventral (front) side is gradually lightened and becomes mostly white. Some areas of the underside of the fore-and hind-limbs have patches of yellow colour. The chest, belly and throat are glandular. The snout is rounded and protruding. Unlike other related species, Mercurana has large webbed toes, while the fingers are free with large discs, and is characterised by the presence of vomerine teeth and lingual papilla. They have distinct dark eyes, with horizontal and oval-shaped pupil.

== Biology ==
Mercurana are arboreal frogs and live in lowland swamp forest. They breed during the pre-monsoon. During the breeding season, males call females at sunset while perched on slender trunks of tree saplings, or branches of understorey vegetation, generally 0.25–1.5 m above the forest floor, during the intervals when the intermittent rainfall subsided. Different advertisement call types were observed. Sometimes males engage in combat with each other for optimal perching sites. The female descends to the male's perch and they engage in axillary amplexus. Then they descend to the forest floor and entered the leaf litter to access the soil substrate below. The female (still in amplexus) used her pointed snout to make a shallow burrow in the soil. She then turns around to position the posterior ends of the pair over the freshly made burrow, and initiates oviposition. A clutch of about 130 non-pigmented eggs are deposited in this nest during a period of about one hour. The female then used her hind legs to mix the eggs with the substrate soil. Then the amplectant pair emerge from the leaf and depart. Motile larvae emerge from the jelly capsule after seven days of embryonic development. Early embryonic development occurs in moist mud after the pre-monsoon rains. The tadpoles are free-living and aquatic. The tadpole is oval and depressed with a brown body and a pale-brown to off-white tail that has translucent fins. The body, tail, and fins have scattered dark brown spots and blotches.

== Distribution ==
Mercurana is endemic to India. The monotypic species Mercurana myristicapalustris has been documented only in the western foothills of the Agasthyamalai Hill Range in Kerala. The habitat preference is also strictly the low-elevation of swampy forest (100 to 300 m asl) dominated by Myristica trees.

== See also ==
- Cirolana mercuryi
- Heteragrion freddiemercuryi
- List of organisms named after famous people (born 1925–1949)
