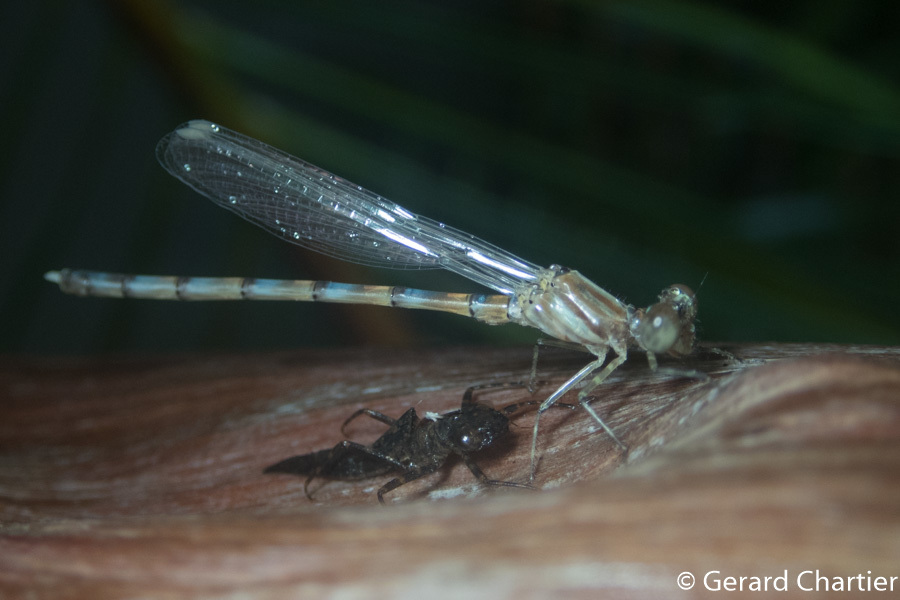
- Rhinagrion viridatum, Cambodia

Scientific classification
- Kingdom: Animalia
- Phylum: Arthropoda
- Clade: Pancrustacea
- Class: Insecta
- Order: Odonata
- Suborder: Zygoptera
- Superfamily: Philogangoidea
- Family: Philosinidae; Kennedy, 1925

Genera
- Philosina; Rhinagrion
- Distribution of Philosinidae

= Philosinidae =

Family of damselflies

Philosinidae is a small family of damselflies in the superfamily Philogangoidea. Members of the family occur mainly in Southeast Asia, where they inhabit forest streams. They are medium-sized to large damselflies with long, narrow wings that are typically held open at rest, a posture shared with several related families formerly included in Megapodagrionidae.

== Description ==
Philosinids are medium-sized to large damselflies with long, narrow wings that are usually held open when at rest. Adults are typically dark in colour with conspicuous yellow, orange, red or blue markings, and some species develop a bluish pruinosity with age.

The wings are clear in most species, although Philosina buchi has a diffuse dark patch near the wing tips. The wings possess numerous fine veins near their outer margins, giving them a densely reticulated appearance.

The larvae possess distinctive caudal gills in which the paired paraprocts are thickened and surround the smaller central epiproct, forming a tubular structure.

== Taxonomic history ==
The lineage was historically included within Megapodagrionidae. In 1925, Kennedy recognised Philosininae as a distinct subfamily, and in a 1959 revision of Megapodagrionidae, Janis Rácenis retained Philosininae as one of five subfamilies within that family.

Subsequent molecular phylogenetic studies showed that Philosina and Rhinagrion form a distinct lineage within Calopterygoidea. The group was therefore elevated to family rank as Philosinidae.

In 2026, Payton Carter and colleagues recognised Philogangidae and Philosinidae as the superfamily Philogangoidea, based on phylogenomic studies that resolved the two families as a distinct lineage of damselflies.

== Genera ==
The following genera are currently placed in Philosinidae:

- Philosina Ris, 1917
- Rhinagrion Calvert, 1913

== Etymology ==
The family name Philosinidae is derived from the type genus Philosina, with the standard zoological suffix -idae used for animal families.

Ris stated that the genus name Philosina was chosen because it recalls the related genus Philoganga, whose general appearance it resembles. The exact derivation of the name was not explained by the author.
