= Amanipodagrion =

Conservation status
- Critically Endangered (IUCN 3.1)

Scientific classification
- Kingdom: Animalia
- Phylum: Arthropoda
- Clade: Pancrustacea
- Class: Insecta
- Order: Odonata
- Suborder: Zygoptera
- Superfamily: Mesopodagrionoidea
- Family: Amanipodagrionidae; Dijkstra & Ware, 2021
- Genus: Amanipodagrion; Pinhey, 1962
- Species: A. gilliesi

Binomial name
- Amanipodagrion gilliesi Pinhey, 1962
- Distribution of Amanipodagrion gilliesi

Genus of damselflies

Amanipodagrion gilliesi is a species of damselfly endemic to the East Usambara Mountains of north-eastern Tanzania. It is the sole species in the genus Amanipodagrion, which in turn is the only genus in the family Amanipodagrionidae, one of two families in the superfamily Mesopodagrionoidea.

Commonly known as the Amani flatwing, it is a slender dark-coloured damselfly with a conspicuous white tip to the abdomen. Males have a broad dark band near the tips of the wings. The species is associated with shaded forest streams and is known from only a tiny area within the Amani-Sigi Forest Reserve in the East Usambara Mountains.

Because of its extremely restricted distribution and the continuing degradation of surrounding forest habitat, the International Union for Conservation of Nature (IUCN) has assessed the Amani flatwing as Critically Endangered.

== Description ==
The Amani flatwing has a long, extremely slender abdomen, which is darkly coloured with a conspicuous white tip. Its wings are distinctly narrower at their base than at their tip, and the males have a broad brown band close to their wing tips.

== Range ==
It is endemic to the Amani Sigi Forest of the East Usambara Mountains from Tanzania. The Amani flatwing population appears to be largely confined to a 500 meter long stream in the Amani-Sigi Forest Reserve, although a single male has been found outside of this reserve.

== Habitat ==
Adult damselflies occur along clear, fast-running streams that are heavily shaded by closed canopy vegetation. Its natural habitats are subtropical or tropical moist lowland forests and rivers.

== Threats ==
Amanipodagrion gilliesi is now critically endangered due to destruction and degradation of its habitat. There has been almost a complete destruction of the low-altitude forest across East Africa, mainly for conversion to agricultural land. The few remaining forests of the East Usambara Mountains where the Amani flatwing is found are under considerable pressure. The main, viable subpopulation of Amani flatwings is relatively safe within the Amani-Sigi Forest Reserve, any other subpopulations within the vicinity are either already extinct or maybe on the verge of extinction as a result of human encroachment, deforestation and water pollution. Also, the protected population of Amani flatwings leads a relatively precarious existence, containing fewer than an estimated 250 mature individuals.

== Conservation ==
The stream around which the one remaining viable population lives is protected within the forest reserve in the East Usambara Conservation Area, and is therefore relatively safe from any danger. Any changes to this stream could result in the extinction of Amanipodagrion gilliesi. It has been advocated that an extensive survey of the whole area is urgently needed to locate any further remaining populations. This species is very close to becoming extinct. Dragonflies and damselflies can't survive well in captivity.

== Family classification ==
Amanipodagrion was described by Pinhey in 1962 and was traditionally placed within Megapodagrionidae, later being included in Argiolestinae.

Molecular phylogenetic studies demonstrated that the genus represents a distinct evolutionary lineage. In 2021, Bybee and colleagues therefore established the monotypic family Amanipodagrionidae to accommodate Amanipodagrion gilliesi.

In 2026, Carter and colleagues subsequently recognised Amanipodagrionidae as one of two families in the superfamily Mesopodagrionoidea.

== Etymology ==
The family name Amanipodagrionidae is derived from the type genus Amanipodagrion, with the standard zoological suffix -idae used for animal families.

The genus name Amanipodagrion combines Amani, the type locality in the East Usambara Mountains of Tanzania, with -podagrion, a name element used in several damselfly genera. Pinhey noted that Amani means "peace", which he considered a desirable quality in Africa.

The species name gilliesi is an eponym honouring M. T. Gillies, who collected two male specimens at Amani in May 1959.
