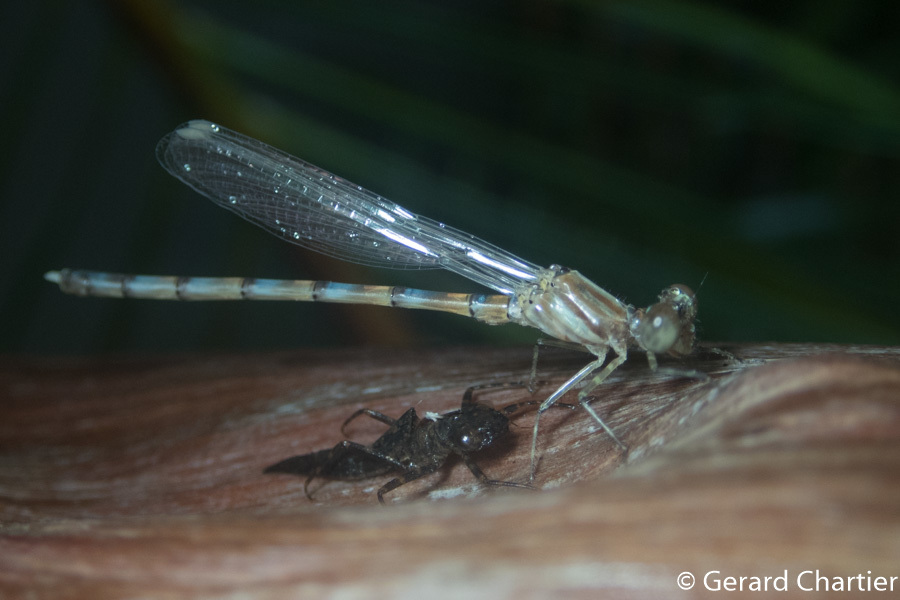
- Rhinagrion viridatum, Cambodia

Scientific classification
- Kingdom: Animalia
- Phylum: Arthropoda
- Clade: Pancrustacea
- Class: Insecta
- Order: Odonata
- Suborder: Zygoptera
- Family: Philosinidae
- Genus: Rhinagrion; Calvert, 1913

Synonyms
- Amphilestes Selys, 1862

= Rhinagrion =

Genus of damselflies

Rhinagrion is a genus of damselflies in the family Philosinidae. There are about 10 described species in Rhinagrion, found mainly in southeast Asia.

== Species ==
These 10 species belong to the genus Rhinagrion:

- Rhinagrion borneense (Selys, 1886)
- Rhinagrion elopurae (McLachlan in Selys, 1886)
- Rhinagrion hainanense Wilson & Reels, 2001
- Rhinagrion macrocephalum (Selys, 1862)
- Rhinagrion mima (Karsch, 1891)
- Rhinagrion philippinum (Selys, 1882)
- Rhinagrion reinhardi Kalkman & Villanueva, 2011
- Rhinagrion schneideri Kalkman & Villanueva, 2011
- Rhinagrion tricolor (Krüger, 1898)
- Rhinagrion viridatum Fraser, 1938

== Etymology ==
Calvert introduced the name Rhinagrion in 1913 to replace Amphilestes, because that name had already been used for a fossil mammal. He said the new name was suggested by Selys’s description of the damselfly as having a “robust head” and a “prominent epistome” (French: «Tête robuste, à épistome saillant»).
