= Dimeragrion =

Scientific classification
- Kingdom: Animalia
- Phylum: Arthropoda
- Clade: Pancrustacea
- Class: Insecta
- Order: Odonata
- Suborder: Zygoptera
- Superfamily: Polythoroidea
- Family: Heteragrionidae
- Genus: Dimeragrion; Calvert, 1913

Genus of damselflies

Dimeragrion is a genus of flatwings in the damselfly suborder Zygoptera, family Heteragrionidae. There are five described species in Dimeragrion.

== Species ==
- Dimeragrion baniwa Mendoza-Penagos, Gonçalves & Vilela, 2023
- Dimeragrion clavijoi De Marmels, 1999
- Dimeragrion mesembrium De Marmels, 1989
- Dimeragrion percubitale Calvert, 1913
- Dimeragrion secundum Needham, 1933
- Dimeragrion unturanense De Marmels, 1992
