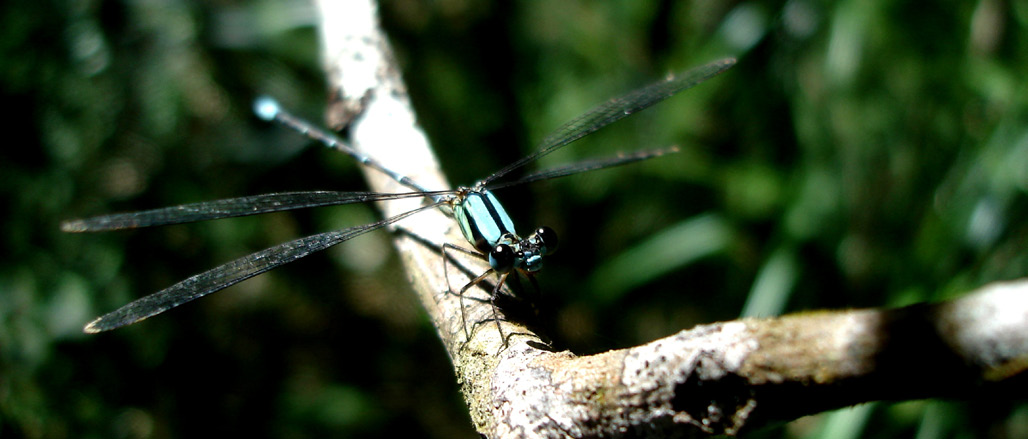
- Heteragrion cyane

Scientific classification
- Kingdom: Animalia
- Phylum: Arthropoda
- Clade: Pancrustacea
- Class: Insecta
- Order: Odonata
- Suborder: Zygoptera
- Family: Heteragrionidae
- Genus: Heteragrion; Selys, 1862

= Heteragrion =

Genus of damselflies

Heteragrion is a genus of damselflies in the family Heteragrionidae.

The genus contains the following species:

- Heteragrion aequatoriale Selys, 1886
- Heteragrion albifrons Ris, 1918
- Heteragrion alienum Williamson, 1919
- Heteragrion angustipenne Selys, 1886
- Heteragrion archon De Marmels, 2008
- Heteragrion atrolineatum Donnelly, 1992
- Heteragrion aurantiacum Selys, 1862
- Heteragrion azulum Dunkle, 1989
- Heteragrion bariai De Marmels, 1989
- Heteragrion beschkii Hagen in Selys, 1862
- Heteragrion bickorum Daigle, 2005
- Heteragrion breweri De Marmels, 1989
- Heteragrion brianmayi Lencioni, 2013 (named after Brian May)
- Heteragrion calendulum Williamson, 1919
- Heteragrion chlorotaeniatum De Marmels, 1989
- Heteragrion chrysops Hagen in Selys, 1862
- Heteragrion cinnamomeum Hagen in Selys, 1862
- Heteragrion consors Hagen in Selys, 1862
- Heteragrion cooki Daigle & Tennessen, 2000
- Heteragrion dorsale Selys, 1862
- Heteragrion eboratum Donnelly, 1965 - ivory-faced flatwing
- Heteragrion erythrogastrum Selys, 1886
- Heteragrion flavidorsum Calvert, 1909
- Heteragrion flavovittatum Selys, 1862
- Heteragrion freddiemercuryi Lencioni, 2013 (named after Freddie Mercury)
- Heteragrion gracile Machado, 2006
- Heteragrion ictericum Williamson, 1919
- Heteragrion icterops Selys, 1862
- Heteragrion inca Calvert, 1909
- Heteragrion luisfelipei Machado, 2006
- Heteragrion johndeaconi Lencioni, 2013 (named after John Deacon)
- Heteragrion majus Selys, 1886
- Heteragrion makiritare De Marmels, 2004
- Heteragrion mantiqueirae Machado, 2006
- Heteragrion melanurum Williamson, 1919
- Heteragrion mitratum Williamson, 1919
- Heteragrion muryense Costa & Santos, 2000
- Heteragrion obsoletum Selys, 1886
- Heteragrion ochraceum Hagen in Selys, 1862
- Heteragrion ovatum Selys, 1862 (nomen dubium)
- Heteragrion palmichale Hartung, 2002
- Heteragrion pemon De Marmels, 1987
- Heteragrion peregrinum Williamson, 1919
- Heteragrion petiense Machado, 1988
- Heteragrion rogertaylori Lencioni, 2013 (named after Roger Taylor)
- Heteragrion rubrifulvum Donnelly, 1992
- Heteragrion silvarum Sjöstedt, 1918
- Heteragrion simulatum Williamson, 1919
- Heteragrion tiradentense Machado & Bedé, 2006
- Heteragrion triangulare Hagen in Selys, 1862
- Heteragrion tricellulare Calvert, 1901 - highland flatwing
- Heteragrion valgum Donnelly, 1992

== Etymology ==
The genus name Heteragrion is derived from the Greek ἕτερος (heteros, "different" or "other") and Agrion, a historical name widely used for damselflies. The name may be interpreted as "the different damselfly", reflecting its distinct appearance among the genera known to Sélys.
