= Protolestes =

- Protolestes kerckhoffae male, Ifanadiana, Madagascar
- Protolestes kerckhoffae female, Ranomafana National Park, Madagascar

Scientific classification
- Kingdom: Animalia
- Phylum: Arthropoda
- Clade: Pancrustacea
- Class: Insecta
- Order: Odonata
- Suborder: Zygoptera
- Superfamily: Tatocnemidoidea
- Family: Protolestidae; Dijkstra & Bybee, 2021
- Genus: Protolestes; Förster, 1899
- Distribution of Protolestes

Genus of damselflies

Protolestes is the sole genus of damselflies in the family Protolestidae, one of three families in the superfamily Tatocnemidoidea. The genus is endemic to eastern Madagascar.

Members of the genus inhabit rainforest streams and are notable for their broad heads and for the larvae with unusual fan-shaped gills. Adults perch with their wings either closed or partly open, unlike many related flatwing damselflies that habitually hold their wings fully outspread.

== Description ==
Protolestids are medium-sized to fairly large damselflies endemic to eastern Madagascar. Adults are typically coloured red, black and yellow, often with contrasting markings, but unlike many tropical damselflies they lack metallic colouration and pruinosity.

The head is notably broad, recalling some members of the unrelated family Platycnemididae. Adults perch with the wings either closed or partly open and hold the abdomen roughly horizontal. The larvae possess distinctive fan-shaped caudal gills, a feature otherwise uncommon among damselflies.

== Family classification ==
Protolestes was described by Friedrich Förster in 1899 from specimens collected on Montagne d'Ambre in northern Madagascar. Förster regarded the genus as closely related to Argiolestes, but distinguished it by differences in wing venation and female morphology.

For much of the twentieth century the genus was placed within Megapodagrionidae. Molecular studies later showed that the broad concept of Megapodagrionidae contained several unrelated lineages. Dijkstra and Bybee established the monogeneric family Protolestidae in 2021 to accommodate Protolestes.

In 2026, Carter and colleagues recognised Protolestidae, Pentaphlebiidae and Tatocnemididae as the superfamily Tatocnemidoidea, based on phylogenomic studies that resolved the three families as a distinct lineage of damselflies.

== Species ==
The following species are currently placed in Protolestes:

- Protolestes fickei Förster, 1899
- Protolestes furcatus Aguesse, 1967
- Protolestes kerckhoffae Schmidt, 1949
- Protolestes leonorae Schmidt, 1949
- Protolestes milloti Fraser, 1949
- Protolestes proselytus Lieftinck, 1965
- Protolestes rufescens Aguesse, 1967
- Protolestes simonei Aguesse, 1967

== Etymology ==
The family name Protolestidae is derived from the type genus Protolestes, with the standard zoological suffix -idae used for animal families.

The genus name Protolestes is presumably derived from the Greek πρῶτος (prōtos, "first" or "primitive") and Lestes, a genus of damselflies. Förster did not explain the derivation, but the name probably reflects his view that the genus represented an early or distinctive member of the broad assemblage of damselflies then associated with Lestes and related groups.
