= Mesopodagrion =

Scientific classification
- Kingdom: Animalia
- Phylum: Arthropoda
- Clade: Pancrustacea
- Class: Insecta
- Order: Odonata
- Suborder: Zygoptera
- Superfamily: Mesopodagrionoidea
- Family: Mesopodagrionidae; Kalkman & Abbott, 2021
- Genus: Mesopodagrion; McLachlan, 1896

Species
- Mesopodagrion tibetanum; Mesopodagrion yachowensis
- Distribution of Mesopodagrion

Genus of damselflies

Mesopodagrion is a genus of damselflies found in southern China and mainland Southeast Asia. It is the only genus in the family Mesopodagrionidae, which is one of two families in the superfamily Mesopodagrionoidea.

Species of Mesopodagrion are medium-sized, dark-coloured damselflies with clear wings, swollen postocular lobes, and a characteristic pattern of pale markings on the head, thorax and abdomen. The aquatic nymphs have distinctive large, fan-shaped gills.

== Family classification ==
Mesopodagrion was described by McLachlan in 1896 and placed in the legion Podagrion, a grouping established by Selys for damselflies now known to belong to several distinct families.

Later classifications included the genus in Megapodagrionidae, where it remained for more than a century. Molecular studies subsequently showed that the broad concept of Megapodagrionidae comprised several unrelated evolutionary lineages. As a result, Kalkman and Abbott established the monotypic family Mesopodagrionidae in 2021 to accommodate the genus Mesopodagrion.

In 2026, Carter and colleagues subsequently recognised Mesopodagrionidae as one of two families in the superfamily Mesopodagrionoidea.

== Species ==
The following species are currently placed in Mesopodagrion:

- Mesopodagrion tibetanum McLachlan, 1896
- Mesopodagrion yachowensis Chao, 1953

== Etymology ==
The family name Mesopodagrionidae is derived from the type genus Mesopodagrion, with the standard zoological suffix -idae used for animal families.

The genus name Mesopodagrion presumably combines the Greek μέσος (mesos, "middle" or "intermediate") with Podagrion, the name of the damselfly group in which McLachlan originally placed the genus. Although McLachlan did not explain the derivation, the name probably refers to an intermediate position within the Podagrion lineage recognised by nineteenth-century odonatologists.
