= Philosina buchi =

Conservation status
- Least Concern (IUCN 3.1)

Scientific classification
- Kingdom: Animalia
- Phylum: Arthropoda
- Clade: Pancrustacea
- Class: Insecta
- Order: Odonata
- Suborder: Zygoptera
- Family: Philosinidae
- Genus: Philosina
- Species: P. buchi

Binomial name
- Philosina buchi Ris, 1917

Species of damselfly

Philosina buchi is a large flatwing damselfly in the family Philosinidae. It can be found in China (Fujian, Guangdong, and Guangxi) and Vietnam (Tom Kompier, 2014).

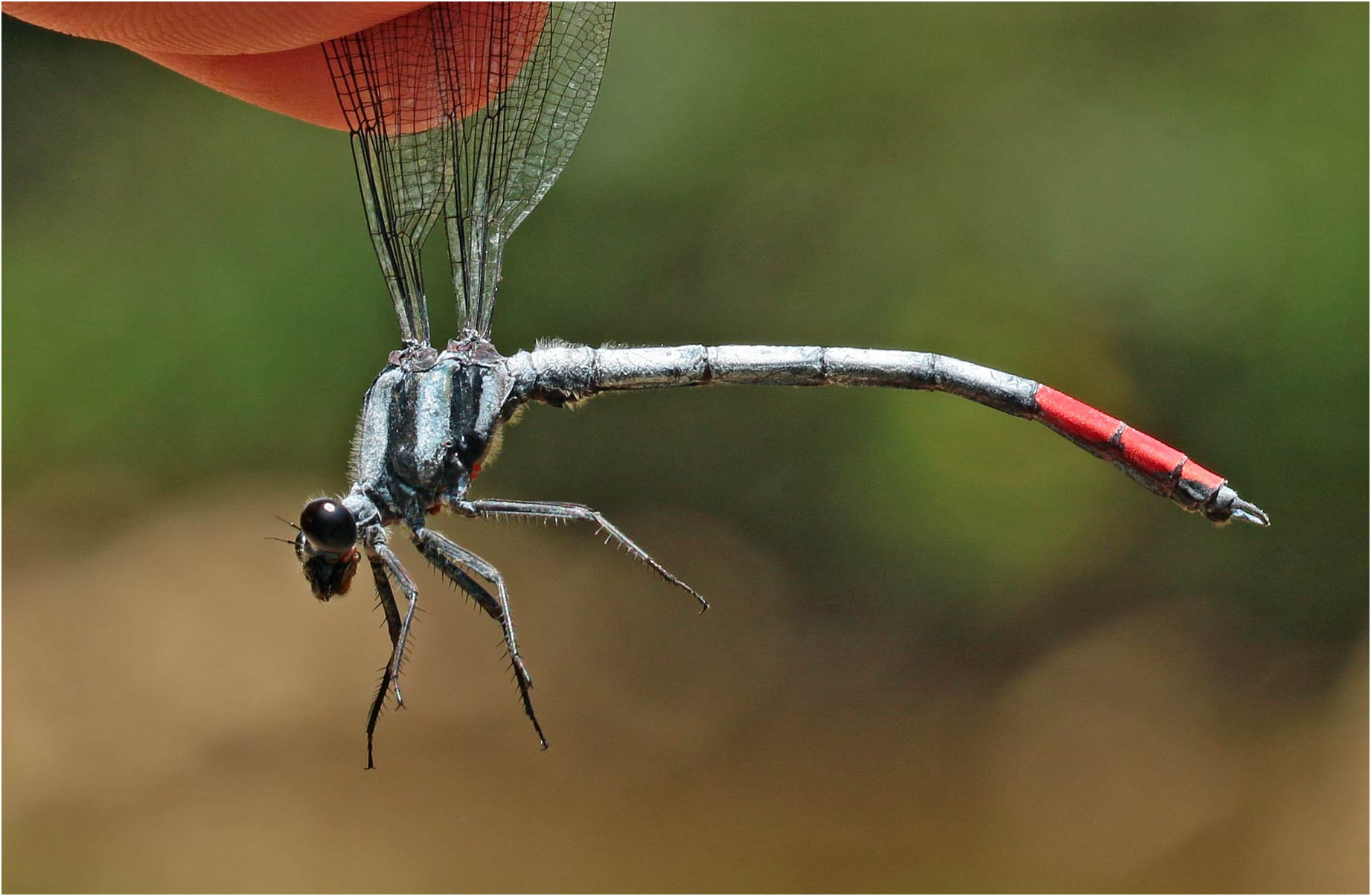
A photo of the Philosinidae species, Philosina buchi in Vietnam (Credit Benoît Guillon).
