= Pentaphlebia =

Scientific classification
- Kingdom: Animalia
- Phylum: Arthropoda
- Clade: Pancrustacea
- Class: Insecta
- Order: Odonata
- Suborder: Zygoptera
- Superfamily: Tatocnemidoidea
- Family: Pentaphlebiidae; Novelo-Gutiérrez, 1995
- Genus: Pentaphlebia; Förster, 1909

Species
- Pentaphlebia gamblesi; Pentaphlebia mangana; Pentaphlebia stahli
- Distribution of Pentaphlebia

Genus of damselflies

Pentaphlebia is the sole genus of damselflies in the family Pentaphlebiidae, one of three families in the superfamily Tatocnemidoidea. The genus occurs in tropical forests of west-central Africa and currently contains three described species.

Species of Pentaphlebia are associated with forest streams and are characterised by their slender bodies, transparent wings and predominantly red to coral-red colouration. Pentaphlebiidae contains only the genus Pentaphlebia and is recognised as a distinct evolutionary lineage of damselflies.

== Description ==
Species of Pentaphlebia are medium-sized damselflies with slender bodies and transparent wings. In the original description of the genus, Förster noted the unusual arrangement of veins in the wings and the predominantly blood-red to coral-red colouration of the abdomen.

Adults are typically found resting on vegetation beside clear forest streams. The larvae possess distinctive abdominal gill tufts, a feature shared with only a few other damselfly lineages and important in the taxonomic history of the group.

== Distribution and habitat ==
Species of Pentaphlebia occur in tropical rainforest regions of west-central Africa. Adults are associated with clear forest streams, where they rest on vegetation along the stream margins.

== Family classification ==
Förster described the genus Pentaphlebia in 1909 from specimens collected in Cameroon by the missionary Heinrich Stahl. For much of the twentieth century the genus was included in Amphipterygidae together with several geographically isolated genera from Central America, South America and Asia.

Novelo-Gutiérrez (1995) recognised that the larvae of Pentaphlebia and Rimanella share distinctive gill tufts that are unique among damselflies and grouped them together in the subfamily Pentaphlebiinae.

Subsequent morphological and molecular studies found little support for a close relationship among the genera traditionally included in Amphipterygidae. Modern classifications therefore recognise Pentaphlebiidae as a separate family containing only the genus Pentaphlebia.

In 2026, Carter and colleagues recognised Pentaphlebiidae, Protolestidae and Tatocnemididae as the superfamily Tatocnemidoidea, based on phylogenomic studies that resolved the three families as a distinct lineage of damselflies.

== Species ==
The following species are currently placed in Pentaphlebia:

- Pentaphlebia gamblesi Parr, 1977
- Pentaphlebia mangana Dijkstra, Lambret & Mézière, 2015
- Pentaphlebia stahli Förster, 1909

== Etymology ==
The family name Pentaphlebiidae is derived from the type genus Pentaphlebia, with the standard zoological suffix -idae used for animal families.

The genus name Pentaphlebia is presumably derived from the Greek πέντε (pente, "five") and φλέψ (phleps, "vein"), referring to the unusually small number of cross-veins in the wings noted by Förster in the original description.

The species name stahli is an eponym honouring Heinrich Stahl, who collected the type specimens on which the genus was established.
