= Mesopodagrionoidea =

Scientific classification
- Kingdom: Animalia
- Phylum: Arthropoda
- Clade: Pancrustacea
- Class: Insecta
- Order: Odonata
- Suborder: Zygoptera
- Superfamily: Mesopodagrionoidea; Kalkman & Abbott, 2021

Families
- Amanipodagrionidae; Mesopodagrionidae
- Distribution of Mesopodagrionoidea

Superfamily of damselflies

Mesopodagrionoidea is a superfamily of damselflies comprising the families Amanipodagrionidae and Mesopodagrionidae. Together they comprise two genera and three recognised species, distributed in eastern Africa and eastern Asia.

Members of the superfamily are slender forest damselflies associated with mountain streams. Adults characteristically perch with their wings held outstretched, a behaviour shared by both families and uncommon among damselflies.

Although separated by thousands of kilometres, the two families form a distinct evolutionary lineage recognised through phylogenomic analyses.

== Taxonomic history ==
The genera Amanipodagrion and Mesopodagrion were traditionally placed within the broadly defined family Megapodagrionidae. Molecular phylogenetic studies demonstrated that they represent two distinct evolutionary lineages unrelated to Megapodagrionidae in its restricted sense.

In 2021, Bybee and colleagues established the monotypic families Amanipodagrionidae and Mesopodagrionidae to accommodate the two genera. Building on subsequent phylogenomic analyses, Carter and colleagues recognised the superfamily Mesopodagrionoidea in 2026 to unite these closely related families.

== Phylogeny ==
- Zygoptera
  - Lestoidea
  - - Platystictoidea
    - - Priscagrionoidea
      - - - Tatocnemidoidea
          - Polythoroidea
        - - - Mesopodagrionoidea
            - - Amphipterygoidea
              - Euphaeoidea
          - - - Philogangoidea
              - - Megapodagrionoidea
                - Calopterygoidea
            - Coenagrionoidea

Relationships among living damselfly superfamilies, based on Carter et al. (2026).

== Families ==
The following families are currently placed in Mesopodagrionoidea:

- Amanipodagrionidae – a monotypic family represented only by Amanipodagrion gilliesi, a critically endangered species endemic to the East Usambara Mountains of Tanzania.
- Mesopodagrionidae – a monotypic family containing the genus Mesopodagrion, with two recognised species distributed in southern China and mainland Southeast Asia.

== Etymology ==
The superfamily name Mesopodagrionoidea is derived from the type genus Mesopodagrion, with the standard zoological suffix -oidea used for animal superfamilies.

The genus name Mesopodagrion presumably combines the Greek μέσος (mesos, "middle" or "intermediate") with Podagrion, the name of the damselfly group in which Robert McLachlan originally placed the genus. Although McLachlan did not explain the derivation, the name probably refers to an intermediate position within the Podagrion lineage recognised by nineteenth-century odonatologists.
