= Philogeniidae =

Scientific classification
- Kingdom: Animalia
- Phylum: Arthropoda
- Clade: Pancrustacea
- Class: Insecta
- Order: Odonata
- Suborder: Zygoptera
- Superfamily: Polythoroidea
- Family: Philogeniidae; Rácenis, 1959

Genera
- Archaeopodagrion; Philogenia
- Distribution of Philogeniidae

Family of insects

Philogeniidae is a small family of damselflies in the superfamily Polythoroidea, found in Central and South America. Members of the family are typically associated with forest streams and are unusual among damselflies in resting with their wings held open, giving them a superficial resemblance to small dragonflies.

The family contains two genera, Philogenia and Archaeopodagrion.

== Description ==
Philogeniids are medium-sized to large damselflies with slender bodies and clear wings that are usually held open when at rest. Adults are typically dark brown or black with yellow, blue or green markings, and males of some species develop a bluish pruinosity on the abdomen.

The wings are long and narrow, with a dense network of veins near their tips, and may be entirely clear or marked with brownish patches. The larvae possess distinctive sac-like caudal gills that narrow towards the middle and terminate in slender filaments.

== Distribution and habitat ==
Philogeniidae is restricted to the Neotropical region. Species occur from Central America into northern and western South America, where they inhabit streams and rivers in forested habitats.

== Taxonomic history ==
Philogenia was described by Edmond de Sélys Longchamps in 1862 from tropical South America. In the original description, Sélys noted similarities between Philogenia and the genus Paraphlebia, while recognising it as a distinct lineage.

In a revision of Megapodagrionidae, Janis Rácenis (1959) established the tribe Philogeniini for Philogenia and several related genera from the Neotropical, Afrotropical and Oceanian regions. The group was defined primarily on wing venation and represented one of several major lineages recognised within the broad concept of Megapodagrionidae then in use.

Subsequent morphological and molecular studies showed that Philogenia and Archaeopodagrion form a distinct evolutionary lineage of damselflies. The tribe Philogeniini was therefore elevated to family rank as Philogeniidae, with the family restricted to those two genera.

In 2026, Carter and colleagues placed Philogeniidae within the newly recognised superfamily Polythoroidea, together with Dicteriadidae, Heteragrionidae, Hypolestidae, Mesagrionidae, Polythoridae and Rimanellidae, reflecting phylogenomic evidence for the relationships among these predominantly Neotropical damselfly lineages.

== Genera ==
The following genera are currently placed in Philogeniidae:

- Archaeopodagrion Kennedy, 1939
- Philogenia Selys, 1862

== Etymology ==
The family name Philogeniidae is derived from the type genus Philogenia, with the standard zoological suffix -idae used for animal families.

The genus name Philogenia is presumably derived from the Greek φίλος (philos, "loving", "fond of" or "friend") and γένος (genos, "kind", "race" or "lineage"). Sélys did not explain the derivation and its intended meaning remains uncertain.
