= Oxystigma (damselfly) =

Scientific classification
- Kingdom: Animalia
- Phylum: Arthropoda
- Clade: Pancrustacea
- Class: Insecta
- Order: Odonata
- Suborder: Zygoptera
- Family: Heteragrionidae
- Genus: Oxystigma; Selys, 1862

Family of damselflies

Oxystigma is a genus of damselflies in the family Heteragrionidae, comprising 3 species.

== Taxonomic history ==
In 1862, Selys discussed the possibility of placing Heteragrion petiolatum in a subgenus named Oxystigma. His wording was tentative: he wrote that he “would have been tempted” to make it a subgenus, then gave reasons against doing so. In 1919, Williamson recounted Sélys's division of Heteragrion into four groups and said that Selys had proposed Oxystigma for the fourth group. Williamson noted that Selys's 1886 treatment did not mention the name again. After a second species in the group had been discovered, Williamson placed the two species in a separate genus, Oxystigma, crediting Selys with the earlier suggestion.

Later catalogues differed in how they cited the genus's authority. Davies and Tobin (1984) listed it as Oxystigma Williamson, 1919. Bridges (1994) listed Oxystigma under Selys, 1862, while noting Cowley's view that the name should be attributed to Williamson, 1919.

== Species ==
The following species are currently placed in Oxystigma:

- Oxystigma caerulans De Marmels, 1987
- Oxystigma cyanofrons Williamson, 1919
- Oxystigma petiolatum (Selys, 1862)
