= Janis Rácenis =

Latvian-born Venezuelan ornithologist and entomologist (1915–1980)

- Jānis Rācenis
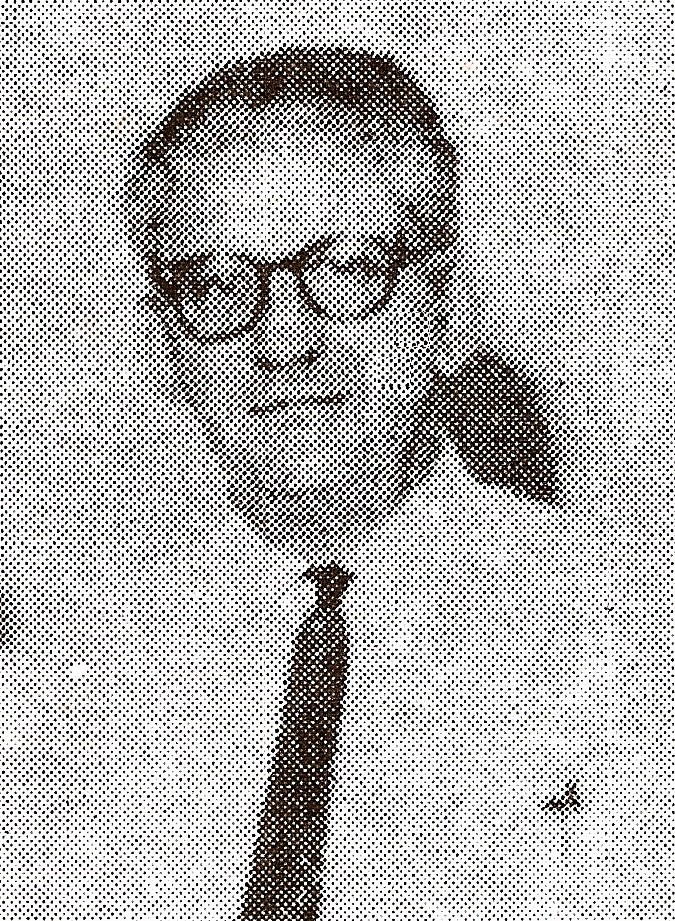
- Born: Jānis Rācenis; 10 April 1915; Riga, Governorate of Livonia, Russian Empire
- Died: 10 April 1980 (aged 65); Caracas, Venezuela
- Education: University of Latvia; University of Erlangen–Nuremberg
- Spouse: Gaida Artens (m. 1947)
- Children: 1

Janis Rácenis (Note: Also hispanicized as Juan Rácenis) (Latvian: Jānis Rācenis; 10 April 1915 – 10 April 1980) was a Latvian-born Venezuelan ornithologist and entomologist. He worked at the University of Caracas and established a museum in Venezuela and collected fauna specimens from the region. He was especially involved in the study of South American odonata.

== Biography ==
Janis Rácenis was born on 10 April 1915 in Riga, Governorate of Livonia (present-day Latvia). His father was teacher Jānis Rācenis (1881-1971) who wrote a textbook on nature stories for schools. Encouraged in the study of nature from a young age he became a volunteers at the Latvian Ornithological Centre where he was ringing birds and writing popular articles. After studies at the Riga Secondary School from 1933 he joined the University of Latvia. He wrote on the birds of Koknese and spent a lot of time in Jurmala. He published in the Latvian journal Folia Zoologica et Hydrobiologica in 1942. He received a master's degree in 1943 after which he worked at the department of mammalogy at the Riga Natural History Museum. In 1944 he and his sister moved to Germany while his parents lived on in Latvia. From 1946 to 1948 he was at the University of Erlangen–Nuremberg where he received a doctorate with work on ornithology.

He married Gaida Artens in 1947. In 1948 he moved to work as a professor at the Universidad Central de Venezuela. He worked at the Rancho Grande National Park studying the fauna. In 1949 he founded the Museo de Biologia. He led a collecting expedition into the Mount Auyán-Tepui region in 1956. In 1965 he established the Institute of Tropical Zoology (Instituto de Zoologia Tropical). He taught zoology and ecology and was an editor for the Bulletin of the Museum of Natural History. In 1951 he founded the Acta Biologica Venezuelica. He had a special interest in the dragonflies after having worked with Bruno Bērziņš (1907-1985) in the 1930s. He examined the dragonflies of Peru, Venezuela and the Neotropics. He established a collection of nearly 20,000 specimens and described 35 new species including Neonura gaida named after his wife. In 1963 he helped establish the Alfredo Jahn Hydrobiology Station at Lake Valencia. In 1964 he travelled through the US to study the university system. During this period he was able to meet his sister again after nearly two decades.

He fell ill in 1979 and died on his 65th birthday. He died at Caracas but was buried at El Hatillo, 5000 km away. He was survived by his wife and daughter. The Biblioteca Janis Rácenis is named after him.
