= Heteragrionidae =

Scientific classification
- Kingdom: Animalia
- Phylum: Arthropoda
- Clade: Pancrustacea
- Class: Insecta
- Order: Odonata
- Suborder: Zygoptera
- Superfamily: Polythoroidea
- Family: Heteragrionidae; Rácenis, 1959

Genera
- Dimeragrion; Heteragrion; Heteropodagrion; Oxystigma
- Distribution of Heteragrionidae

Family of damselflies

Heteragrionidae is a family of damselflies in the superfamily Polythoroidea, found in tropical Central and South America. The family contains four genera and more than 60 recognised species, most of which occur in forest streams and rivers.

Members of the family are medium-sized to large damselflies, many of which are brightly coloured with orange, red or yellow markings. Unlike most damselflies, many species rest with their wings held partly or fully open, giving them a superficial resemblance to dragonflies.

== Description ==
Members of Heteragrionidae are typically associated with forest streams and rivers in tropical Central and South America. Adults are often found perching on vegetation or rocks beside flowing water.

Most genera in the family rest with their wings held open, unlike the majority of damselflies, which normally hold their wings closed above the abdomen. The genus Heteropodagrion is an exception and typically rests with the wings folded.

The larvae possess distinctive caudal gills that narrow into a slender terminal filament. Similar gill structures occur in several related Neotropical damselfly groups and have been important in understanding relationships within the family.

== Taxonomic history ==
In a revision of Megapodagrionidae, Janis Rácenis (1959) established the tribe Heteragrionini for a group of Neotropical damselflies centred on the genus Heteragrion. He considered these genera sufficiently distinctive to form a separate lineage within the broader family.

As damselfly classification improved, researchers found that the traditional Megapodagrionidae contained several unrelated groups that had been classified together largely because of superficial similarities. In 2014, Dijkstra and colleagues recognised Heteragrionidae as a separate family, initially containing the genera Heteragrion and Oxystigma.

Further studies published in 2021 showed that the closely related genera Dimeragrion and Heteropodagrion also belong within this lineage. Modern classifications therefore recognise Heteragrionidae as a family of four genera distributed throughout tropical Central and South America.

In 2026, Carter and colleagues placed Heteragrionidae within the newly recognised superfamily Polythoroidea, together with Dicteriadidae, Hypolestidae, Mesagrionidae, Philogeniidae, Polythoridae and Rimanellidae, reflecting phylogenomic evidence for the relationships among these predominantly Neotropical damselfly lineages.

== Genera ==
The following genera are currently placed in Heteragrionidae:

- Dimeragrion Calvert, 1913
- Heteragrion Selys, 1862
- Heteropodagrion Selys, 1885
- Oxystigma Selys, 1862

== Etymology ==
The family name Heteragrionidae is derived from the type genus Heteragrion, with the standard zoological suffix -idae used for animal families.

The genus name Heteragrion is presumably derived from the Greek ἕτερος (heteros, "different" or "other") and Agrion, a historical name widely used for damselflies. The name may be interpreted as "the different damselfly", reflecting its distinct appearance among the genera known to Sélys.
