= List of damselflies of the world (Calopterygidae) =

- Archineura hetaerinoides
- Archineura incarnata
- Caliphaea confusa
- Caliphaea consimilis
- Caliphaea thailandica
- Calopteryx aequabilis
- Calopteryx amata
- Calopteryx angustipennis
- Calopteryx atrata
- Calopteryx balcanica
- Calopteryx coomani
- Calopteryx cornelia
- Calopteryx dimidiata
- Calopteryx exul
- Calopteryx haemorrhoidalis
- Calopteryx hyalina
- Calopteryx intermedia
- Calopteryx japonica
- Calopteryx laosica
- Calopteryx maculata
- Calopteryx maracandica
- Calopteryx melli
- Calopteryx mingrelica
- Calopteryx oberthuri
- Calopteryx orientalis
- Calopteryx samarcandica
- Calopteryx splendens
- Calopteryx syriaca
- Calopteryx taurica
- Calopteryx transcaspica
- Calopteryx unicolor
- Calopteryx virgo
- Calopteryx waterstoni
- Calopteryx xanthostoma
- Echo margarita
- Echo maxima
- Echo modesta
- Echo uniformis
- Hetaerina amazonica
- Hetaerina americana
- Hetaerina auripennis
- Hetaerina aurora
- Hetaerina brightwelli
- Hetaerina caja
- Hetaerina capitalis
- Hetaerina charca
- Hetaerina cruentata
- Hetaerina curvicauda
- Hetaerina duplex
- Hetaerina erythrokalamus
- Hetaerina flavipennis
- Hetaerina fuscoguttata
- Hetaerina gallardi
- Hetaerina hebe
- Hetaerina indeprensa
- Hetaerina infecta
- Hetaerina laesa
- Hetaerina longipes
- Hetaerina majuscula
- Hetaerina medinai
- Hetaerina mendezi
- Hetaerina miniata
- Hetaerina moribunda
- Hetaerina mortua
- Hetaerina occisa
- Hetaerina pilula
- Hetaerina proxima
- Hetaerina rosea
- Hetaerina rudis
- Hetaerina sanguinea
- Hetaerina sempronia
- Hetaerina simplex
- Hetaerina titia
- Hetaerina vulnerata
- Hetaerina westfalli
- Iridictyon myersi
- Iridictyon trebbaui
- Matrona basilaris
- Matrona cyanoptera
- Matrona taoi
- Mnais andersoni
- Mnais gregoryi
- Mnais incolor
- Mnais maclachlani
- Mnais mneme
- Mnais nawai
- Mnais pruinosa
- Mnais semiopaca
- Mnais tenuis
- Mnesarete aenea
- Mnesarete astrape
- Mnesarete borchgravii
- Mnesarete cupraea
- Mnesarete devillei
- Mnesarete fulgida
- Mnesarete fuscibasis
- Mnesarete globifer
- Mnesarete grisea
- Mnesarete guttifera
- Mnesarete hauxwelli
- Mnesarete hyalina
- Mnesarete imperatrix
- Mnesarete marginata
- Mnesarete mariana
- Mnesarete metallica
- Mnesarete pruinosa
- Mnesarete pudica
- Mnesarete regina
- Mnesarete rollinati
- Mnesarete saltuum
- Mnesarete smaragdina
- Neurobasis anderssoni
- Neurobasis anumariae
- Neurobasis australis
- Neurobasis chinensis
- Neurobasis cyaneipennis
- Neurobasis daviesi
- Neurobasis ianthinipennis
- Neurobasis kaupi
- Neurobasis kimminsi
- Neurobasis longipes
- Neurobasis luzoniensis
- Noguchiphaea yoshikoae
- Phaon camerunensis
- Phaon iridipennis
- Psolodesmus mandarinus
- Sapho bicolor
- Sapho ciliata
- Sapho fumosa
- Sapho gloriosa
- Sapho orichalcea
- Sapho puella
- Umma cincta
- Umma declivium
- Umma distincta
- Umma electa
- Umma femina
- Umma infumosa
- Umma longistigma
- Umma mesostigma
- Umma mesumbei
- Umma purpurea
- Umma saphirina
- Vestalis amabilis
- Vestalis amaryllis
- Vestalis amethystina
- Vestalis amnicola
- Vestalis amoena
- Vestalis anacolosa
- Vestalis anne
- Vestalis apicalis
- Vestalis atropha
- Vestalis beryllae
- Vestalis gracilis
- Vestalis luctuosa
- Vestalis lugens
- Vestalis melania
- Vestalis miao
- Vestalis smaragdina
- Vestalis yunosukei
