= Calopteryx intermedia =

Scientific classification
- Domain: Eukaryota
- Kingdom: Animalia
- Phylum: Arthropoda
- Class: Insecta
- Order: Odonata
- Suborder: Zygoptera
- Family: Calopterygidae
- Genus: Calopteryx
- Species: C. intermedia

Binomial name
- Calopteryx intermedia Selys, 1890

Species of damselfly

Calopteryx intermedia is a species of broad-winged damselfly in the family Calopterygidae.

== Subspecies ==
These three subspecies belong to the species Calopteryx intermedia:

- Calopteryx intermedia cecilia Bartenef, 1912
- Calopteryx intermedia intermedia
- Calopteryx intermedia persica Bartenef, 1911
