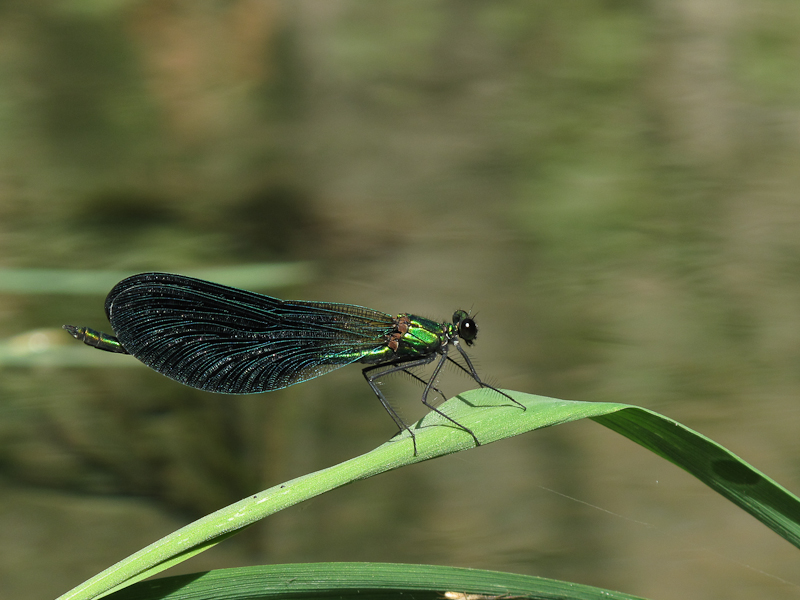

Scientific classification
- Domain: Eukaryota
- Kingdom: Animalia
- Phylum: Arthropoda
- Class: Insecta
- Order: Odonata
- Suborder: Zygoptera
- Family: Calopterygidae
- Subfamily: Calopteryginae
- Tribe: Calopterygini
- Genus: Calopteryx
- Species: C. samarcandica

Binomial name
- Calopteryx samarcandica Bartenev, 1912

= Calopteryx samarcandica =

Species of damselfly

Calopteryx samarcandica is a species of broad-winged damselfly in the family Calopterygidae.
