= Calopteryx orientalis =

Conservation status
- Least Concern (IUCN 3.1)

Scientific classification
- Kingdom: Animalia
- Phylum: Arthropoda
- Class: Insecta
- Order: Odonata
- Suborder: Zygoptera
- Family: Calopterygidae
- Genus: Calopteryx
- Species: C. orientalis

Binomial name
- Calopteryx orientalis Selys, 1887

Species of damselfly

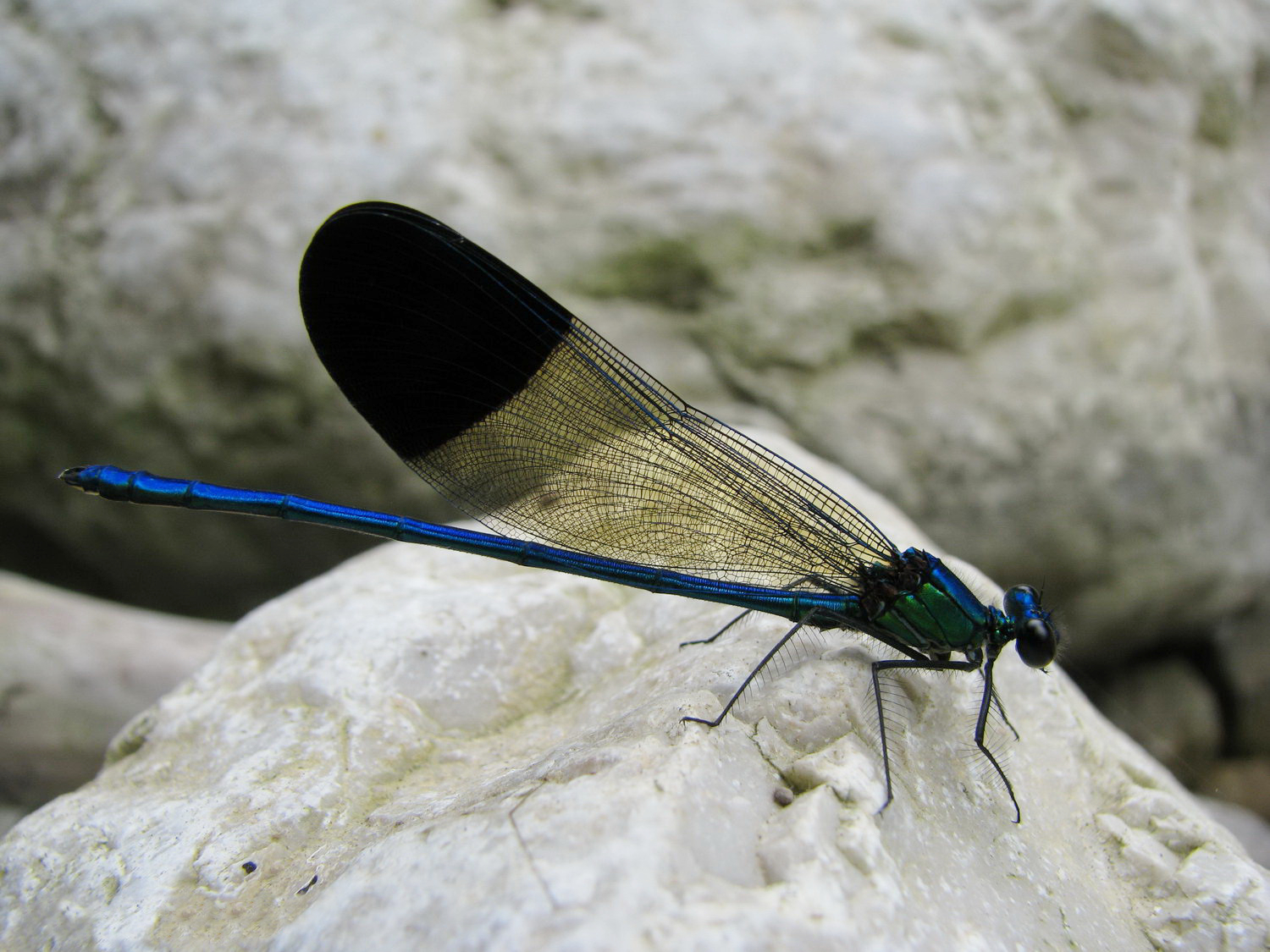

Calopteryx orientalis is a species of broad-winged damselfly in the family Calopterygidae.

The IUCN conservation status of Calopteryx orientalis is "LC", least concern, with no immediate threat to the species' survival. The population is stable. The IUCN status was reviewed in 2009.

== Subspecies ==
These two subspecies belong to the species Calopteryx orientalis:

- Calopteryx orientalis orientalis
- Calopteryx orientalis risi Schmidt, 1954
