= Calopteryx transcaspica =

Scientific classification
- Domain: Eukaryota
- Kingdom: Animalia
- Phylum: Arthropoda
- Class: Insecta
- Order: Odonata
- Suborder: Zygoptera
- Family: Calopterygidae
- Genus: Calopteryx
- Species: C. transcaspica

Binomial name
- Calopteryx transcaspica Bartenef, 1911

Species of damselfly

Calopteryx transcaspica is a species of broad-winged damselfly in the family Calopterygidae.
