= Calopteryx cornelia =

Conservation status
- Least Concern (IUCN 3.1)

Scientific classification
- Kingdom: Animalia
- Phylum: Arthropoda
- Class: Insecta
- Order: Odonata
- Suborder: Zygoptera
- Family: Calopterygidae
- Genus: Calopteryx
- Species: C. cornelia

Binomial name
- Calopteryx cornelia Sélys, 1853

Species of damselfly

Calopteryx cornelia is a species of broad-winged damselfly in the family Calopterygidae.

The IUCN conservation status of Calopteryx cornelia is "least concern", with no immediate threat to the species' survival. The population is stable. The IUCN status was reviewed in 2009.
