= Calopteryx laosica =

Scientific classification
- Domain: Eukaryota
- Kingdom: Animalia
- Phylum: Arthropoda
- Class: Insecta
- Order: Odonata
- Suborder: Zygoptera
- Family: Calopterygidae
- Genus: Calopteryx
- Species: C. laosica

Binomial name
- Calopteryx laosica Fraser, 1933

Species of damselfly

Calopteryx laosica is a species of broad-winged damselfly in the family Calopterygidae.
