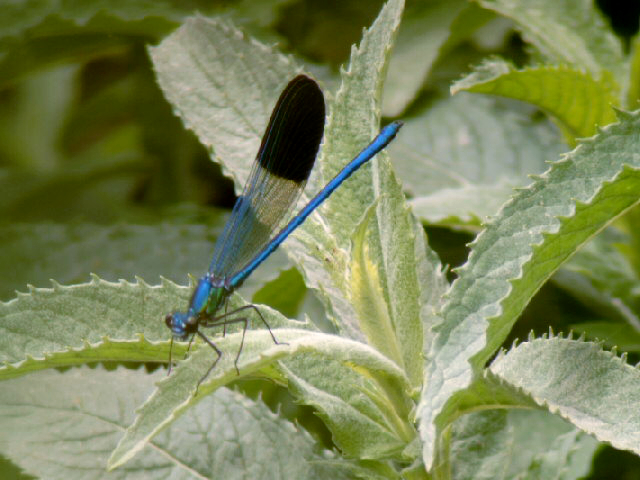

Conservation status
- Endangered (IUCN 3.1)

Scientific classification
- Kingdom: Animalia
- Phylum: Arthropoda
- Class: Insecta
- Order: Odonata
- Suborder: Zygoptera
- Family: Calopterygidae
- Genus: Calopteryx
- Species: C. syriaca

Binomial name
- Calopteryx syriaca Rambur, 1842

= Calopteryx syriaca =

Species of damselfly

Calopteryx syriaca is a species of damselfly in the family Calopterygidae known commonly as the Syrian demoiselle. It is native to the southern Levant, where it is known from Israel, Jordan, Lebanon, Palestine, and Syria. This is sometimes considered to be a subspecies of the banded demoiselle (C. splendens).

This damselfly inhabits habitat along rivers such as the Orontes, Litani, and Jordan. Its populations have declined due to loss of habitat in the river systems in the area.
