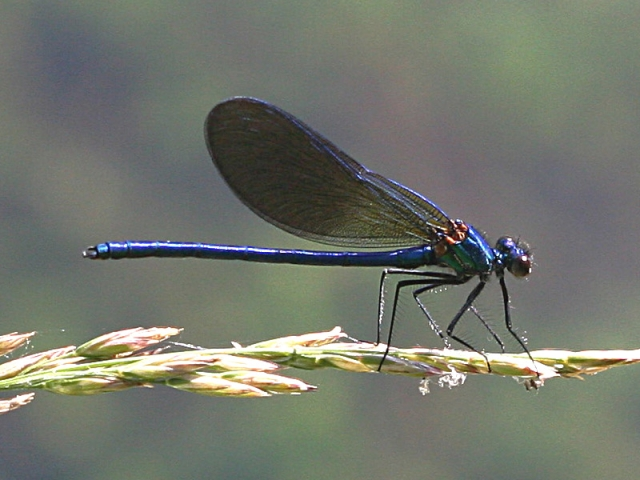

Conservation status
- Least Concern (IUCN 3.1)

Scientific classification
- Kingdom: Animalia
- Phylum: Arthropoda
- Class: Insecta
- Order: Odonata
- Suborder: Zygoptera
- Family: Calopterygidae
- Genus: Calopteryx
- Species: C. xanthostoma

Binomial name
- Calopteryx xanthostoma (Charpentier, 1825)

Synonyms
- Agrion xanthostoma Charpentier, 1825

= Western demoiselle =

Species of damselfly

The western demoiselle or yellow-tailed demoiselle (Calopteryx xanthostoma) is a species of damselfly belonging to the family Calopterygidae. It replaces the banded demoiselle (C. splendens) in southern France and the Iberian Peninsula, and is sometimes considered a subspecies of that species (hybrids frequently occur in areas where they overlap).

The male of C. xanthostoma generally has more extensive colouring in the wings than that of C.splendens, usually reaching to the wingtips. Unlike C. splendens, the males have clear wings when first emerging as adults, only developing the wing colour during the first week as an adult.

The colour of the underside of the tip of the abdomen is sometimes cited as an identification feature, being said to be yellowish in this species and whitish in C. splendens, but some sources consider this to be unreliable. The metallic green, clear-winged females are virtually identical to female C. splendens and are difficult to separate, even in the hand.

This species lives in habitat around running watercourses, such as streams and rivers, usually in open or somewhat shady areas.
