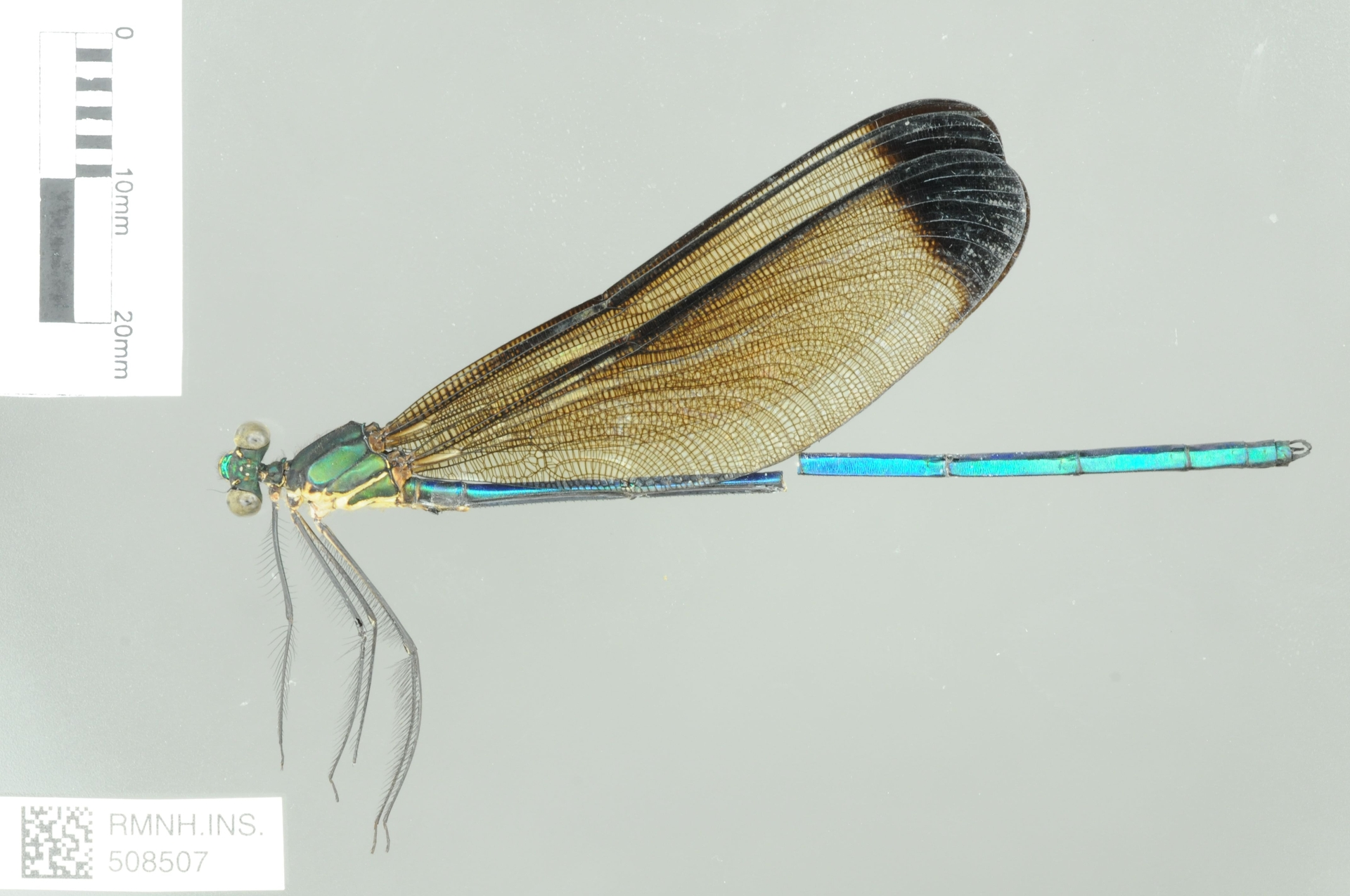

Scientific classification
- Domain: Eukaryota
- Kingdom: Animalia
- Phylum: Arthropoda
- Class: Insecta
- Order: Odonata
- Suborder: Zygoptera
- Family: Calopterygidae
- Genus: Calopteryx
- Species: C. melli

Binomial name
- Calopteryx melli Ris, 1912

= Calopteryx melli =

Species of damselfly

Calopteryx melli is a species of broad-winged damselfly in the family Calopterygidae.
