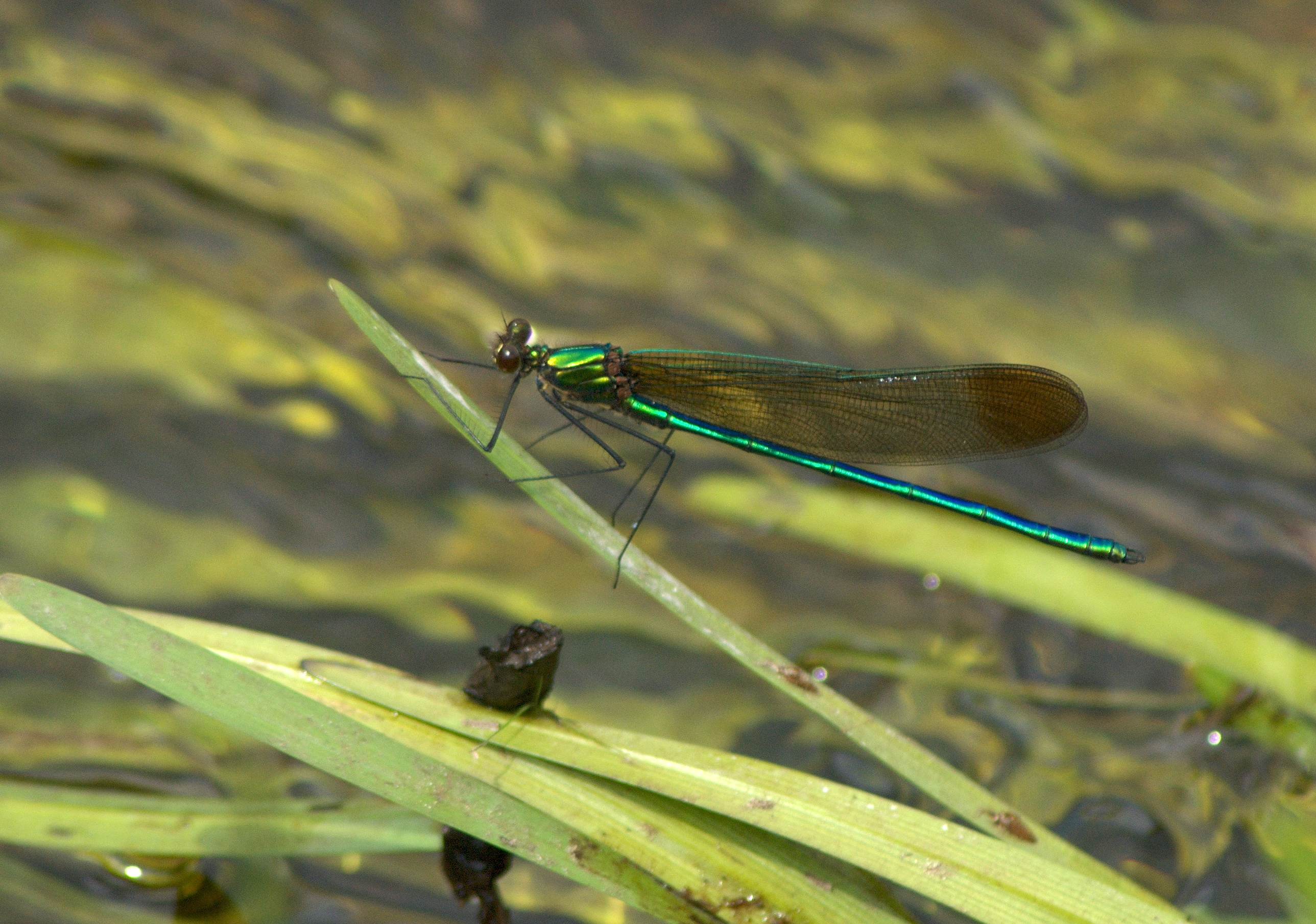

Conservation status
- Apparently Secure (NatureServe)

Scientific classification
- Kingdom: Animalia
- Phylum: Arthropoda
- Class: Insecta
- Order: Odonata
- Suborder: Zygoptera
- Family: Calopterygidae
- Genus: Calopteryx
- Species: C. amata

Binomial name
- Calopteryx amata Hagen, 1889

= Superb jewelwing =

Species of damselfly

The superb jewelwing (Calopteryx amata) is a species of damselfly in the family Calopterygidae. It is native to North America, where it is distributed in eastern Canada and the northeastern United States as far south as Tennessee.

The superb jewelwing is about 2 inches long. The male is bright metallic green with amber markings on its wings. The female is bronze-tinged with greenish wings tipped in white. The adult is active in June and July. Adults and nymphs eat smaller insects.

This species lives along clear rivers and streams with vegetation nearby. The males are territorial. This species may be found with dragonflies of the genus Ophiogomphus.
