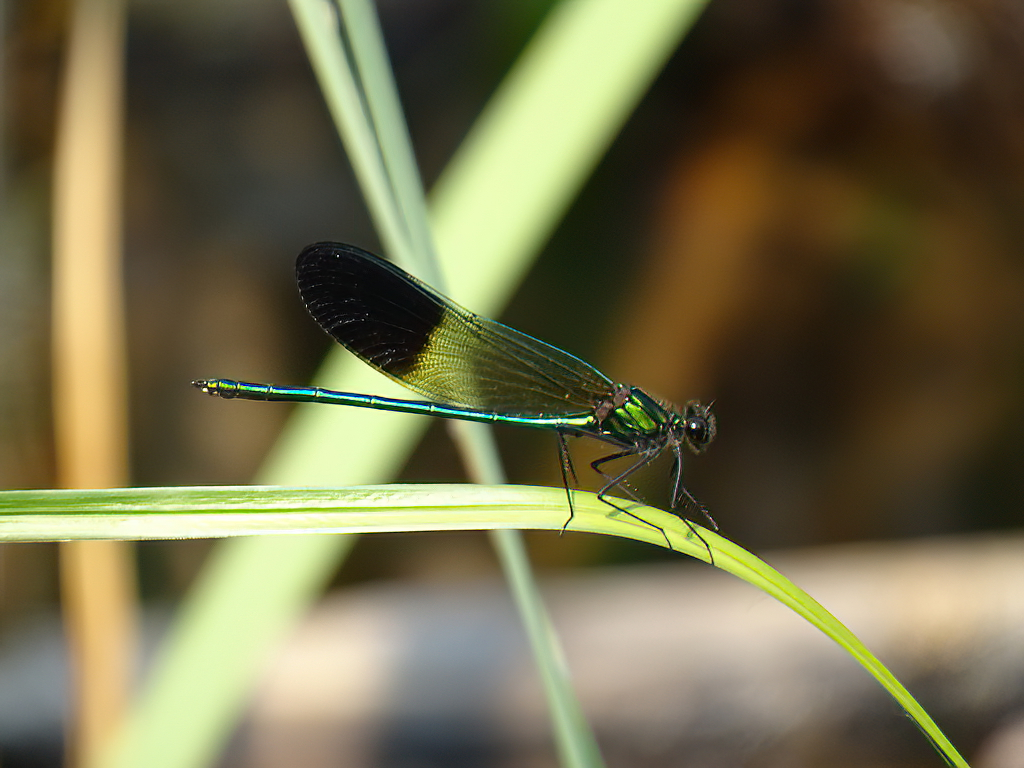

Conservation status
- Least Concern (IUCN 3.1)

Scientific classification
- Kingdom: Animalia
- Phylum: Arthropoda
- Class: Insecta
- Order: Odonata
- Suborder: Zygoptera
- Family: Calopterygidae
- Genus: Calopteryx
- Species: C. aequabilis

Binomial name
- Calopteryx aequabilis Say, 1839

= Calopteryx aequabilis =

Species of damselfly

Calopteryx aequabilis, the river jewelwing, is a species of broad-winged damselfly. The species was first described by Thomas Say in 1839. It is found from British Columbia to Newfoundland and southward to most of the northern part of the United States.

== Description ==
The male has a metallic blue-green body and black wing tips. The female is duller brown with smoky wing tips that have white spots near the tips. The naiad is pale brown with darker markings.

== Habitat ==
It lives near small to moderate forest streams.
