= Calopteryx exul =

Glittering demoiselle

Conservation status
- Endangered (IUCN 3.1)

Scientific classification
- Kingdom: Animalia
- Phylum: Arthropoda
- Class: Insecta
- Order: Odonata
- Suborder: Zygoptera
- Family: Calopterygidae
- Genus: Calopteryx
- Species: C. exul

Binomial name
- Calopteryx exul Sélys, 1853

Species of damselfly

Calopteryx exul (glittering demoiselle) is an endangered species of damselfly in the family Calopterygidae. It is endemic to Algeria, Morocco, and Tunisia. The species lives in isolated subpopulations within fragmented habitats, and the largest populations found were located in Northeast Algeria. Their preferred habitat is lotic systems, featuring fast and shallow water, sparse vegetation, and a low amount of shade.

This is a large damselfly with a total length of up to 50 mm. Unlike most other Calopteryx damselflies, the wings are unbanded in both sexes although the male has metallic venation that produce a distinctive blue flash on each wing beat when the insect is flying in the sun. The males in this species tend to be territorial and when the females lay their eggs in patches of plants the males guard the plants. This species is known for having a partial bivoltine life cycle. C. exul is believed to be an offshoot of splendens-like taxa from the Central Mediterranean islands and peninsular Italy.

== Lifecycle ==
Mating occurs on patches of vegetation on the water. Female glittering demoiselle then select target host plants by vision, and oviposit the eggs in floating leaves. Some of the plants that C. exul is known to use for oviposition include Typha angustifolia, Paspalum distichum, and Potamogeton nodosus. The larvae are approximately 22 mm long, have ocelli, are relatively covered with setae, and are yellow to brownish in color.

The adult flight period of glittering demoiselle has two generations, the first and longer generation from early May to late July, and the second shorter generation from September to October.

== Behavior ==
Glittering demoiselle can undertake long distance dispersal to seek out more suitable habitats, and travel distances up to five kilometers away. Individuals hunt with ambush tactics, and often engage in communal roosting overnight.

== Conservation ==
Rivers are threatened by pollution and anthropogenic activity. The oviposition of this species has a limited number of host plants, and preservation of these plants in their natural environments promotes colonization. One of the major concerns for this species is drought which affects both the water level and flow, and can contribute to the extirpation of a subpopulation.

== See also ==
- Dijkstra, Klaas-Douwe B. (2006). Field Guide to the Dragonflies of Britain and Europe. p. 69. ISBN 0-9531399-4-8.
