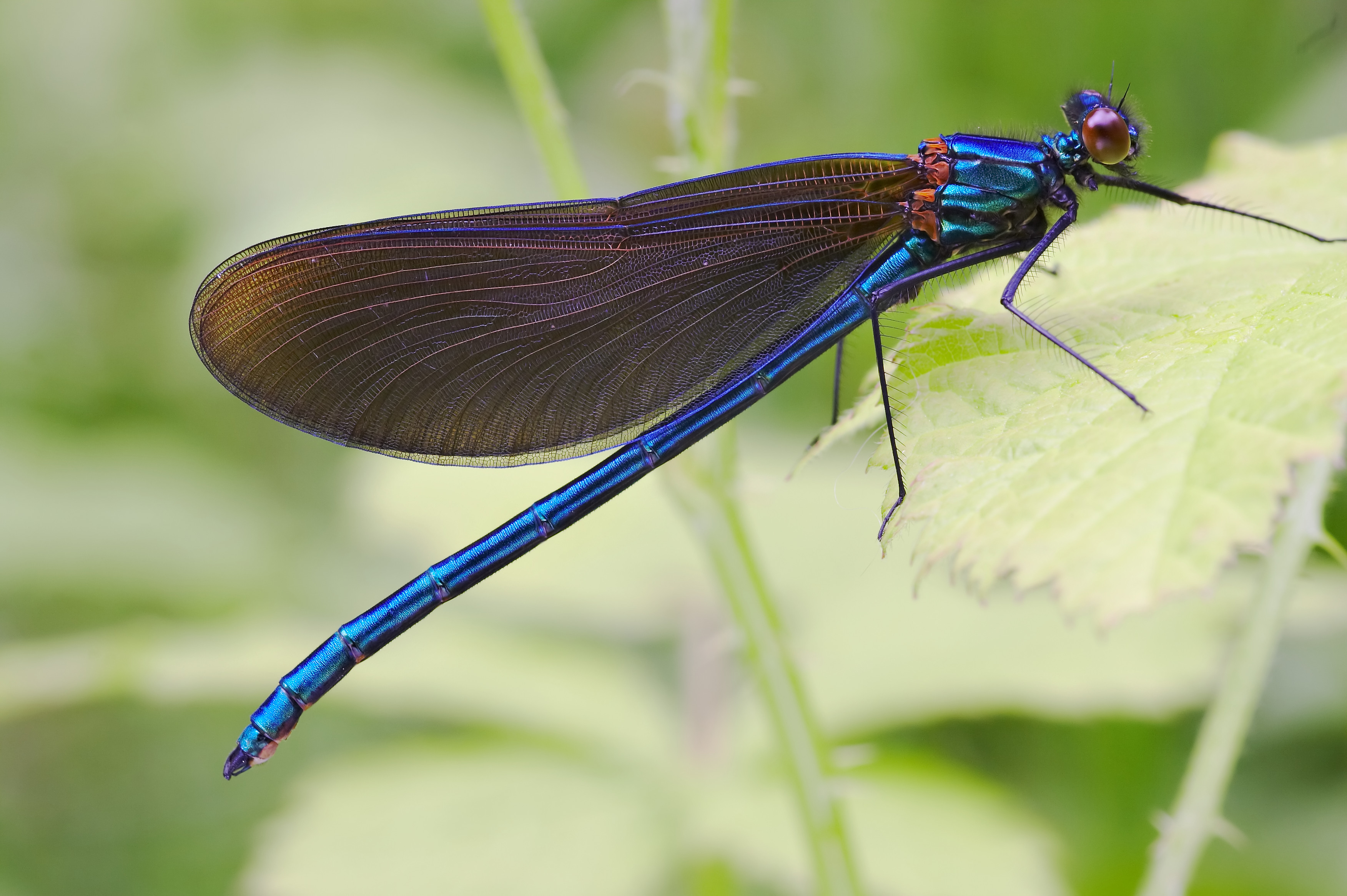
- Calopteryx virgo

Scientific classification
- Kingdom: Animalia
- Phylum: Arthropoda
- Clade: Pancrustacea
- Class: Insecta
- Order: Odonata
- Suborder: Zygoptera
- Family: Calopterygidae
- Tribe: Calopterygini
- Genus: Calopteryx; Leach, 1815

Synonyms
- Agrion Fabricius, 1775; Agrionus Rafinesque, 1815 Emend.; Agrium Agassiz, 1846 Emend.; Sylphus Hagen, 1853; Anaciagrion Kennedy, 1920

= Calopteryx (damselfly) =

Genus of damselflies

Calopteryx is a genus of large damselflies belonging to the family Calopterygidae. The colourful males often have coloured wings whereas the more muted females usually have clear wings although some develop male (androchrome) wing characteristics. In both sexes, there is no pterostigma.

== Nomenclature ==
The genus was first introduced by Leach in the Edinburgh Encyclopaedia (1815) under the spelling Calepteryx, generally regarded as a printer's error for Calopteryx.

It was only in 1890, many years after Leach introduced the genus, that it was widely recognised that Calopteryx was potentially a junior synonym of the Fabrician genus Agrion, established 40 years earlier. The controversy surrounding which genus name has nomenclatural priority has never been formally resolved; the ICZN rules would give priority to Fabricius' name, but most odonatists continue to use Calopteryx.

== Species ==
The genus contains the following species:

- Calopteryx aequabilis Say, 1839 – River Jewelwing
- Calopteryx amata Hagen, 1889 – Superb Jewelwing
- Calopteryx angustipennis (Hagen in Selys, 1853) – Appalachian Jewelwing
- Calopteryx balcanica Fudakowsky, 1930
- Calopteryx coomani (Fraser, 1935)
- Calopteryx cornelia Selys, 1853
- Calopteryx dimidiata (Burmeister, 1839) – Sparkling Jewelwing
- Calopteryx exul Selys, 1853 – Glittering Demoiselle
- Calopteryx haemorrhoidalis (van der Linden, 1825) – Copper Demoiselle
- Calopteryx hyalina Martin, 1909 – Clear-winged Demoiselle
- Calopteryx intermedia Selys, 1887
- Calopteryx japonica Selys, 1869
- Calopteryx laosica Fraser, 1933
- Calopteryx maculata (Palisot de Beauvois, 1805) – Ebony Jewelwing
- Calopteryx melli Ris, 1912
- Calopteryx mingrelica Selys, 1869
- Calopteryx oberthuri McLachlan, 1894
- Calopteryx orientalis Selys, 1887
- Calopteryx samarcandica Bartenev, 1912
- Calopteryx splendens (Harris, 1780) – Banded Demoiselle, Banded Agrion, Banded Jewelwing (inc. Calopteryx splendens taurica Selys, 1853)
- Calopteryx syriaca (Rambur, 1842) – Syrian Demoiselle
- Calopteryx transcaspica Bartenev, 1912
- Calopteryx virgo (Linnaeus, 1758) – Beautiful Demoiselle, Beautiful Jewelwing
- Calopteryx waterstoni Schneider, 1984
- Calopteryx xanthostoma (Charpentier, 1825) – Western Demoiselle

== Etymology ==
The genus name Calopteryx, established by Leach in 1815, is derived from the Greek καλός (kalos, "beautiful") and πτέρυξ (pteryx, "wing"), likely referring to the often brightly coloured and metallic wings characteristic of these damselflies.
