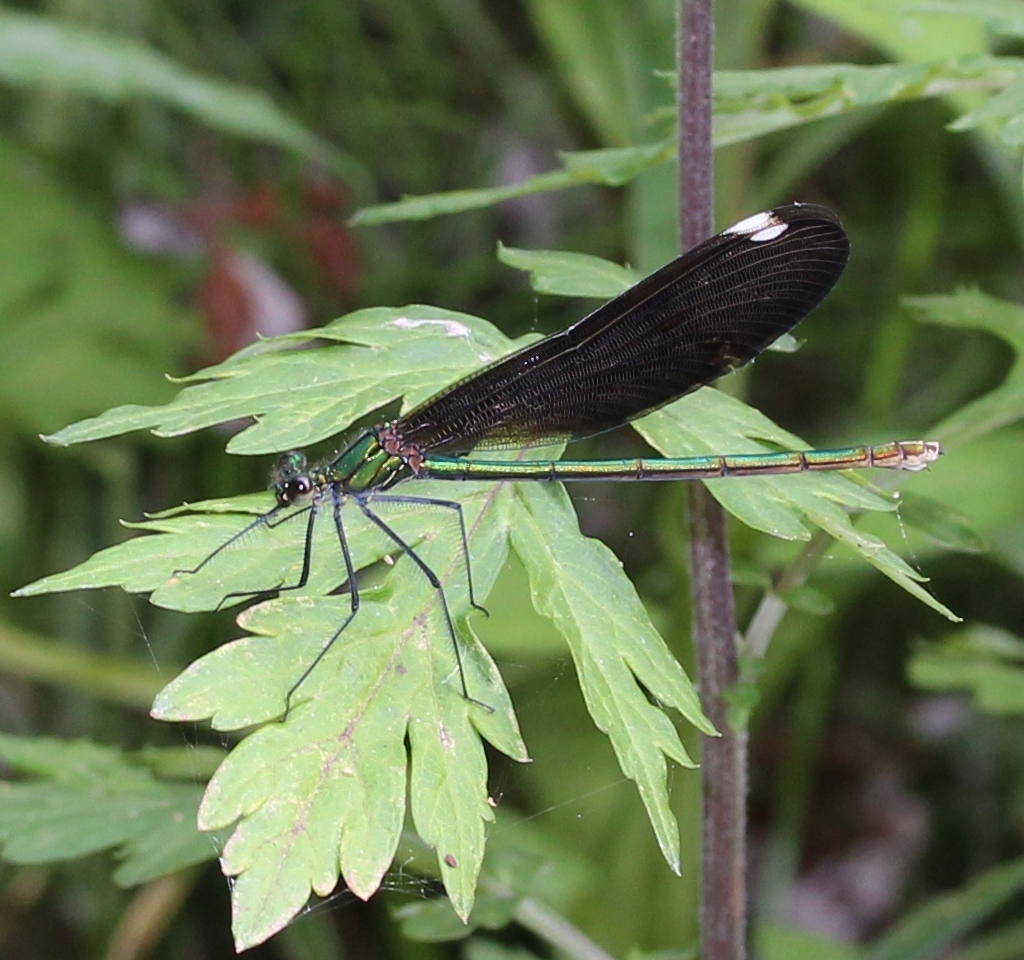
- Calopteryx japonica female in Japan.

Conservation status
- Least Concern (IUCN 3.1)

Scientific classification
- Kingdom: Animalia
- Phylum: Arthropoda
- Class: Insecta
- Order: Odonata
- Suborder: Zygoptera
- Family: Calopterygidae
- Subfamily: Calopteryginae
- Tribe: Calopterygini
- Genus: Calopteryx
- Species: C. japonica

Binomial name
- Calopteryx japonica Selys, 1869

= Calopteryx japonica =

Species of damselfly

Calopteryx japonica is a species of broad-winged damselfly in the family Calopterygidae. It is found in East Asia (Russian Far East, Japan, Korea, and eastern China).
