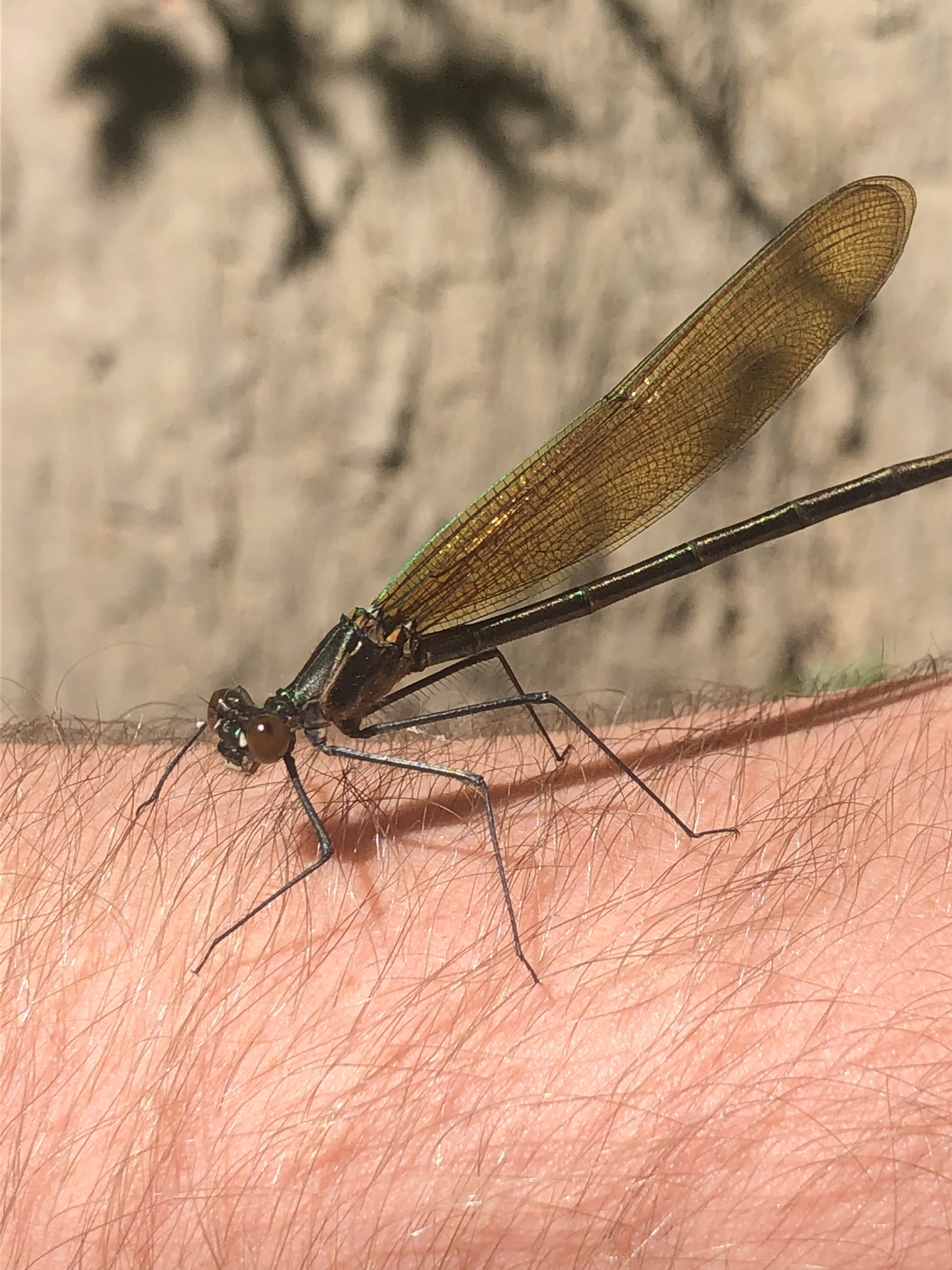

Conservation status
- Least Concern (IUCN 3.1)

Scientific classification
- Kingdom: Animalia
- Phylum: Arthropoda
- Class: Insecta
- Order: Odonata
- Suborder: Zygoptera
- Family: Calopterygidae
- Genus: Calopteryx
- Species: C. angustipennis

Binomial name
- Calopteryx angustipennis (Selys, 1853)

Synonyms
- Sylphis angustipennis Hagen in Selys 1853; Sylphis elegans Hagen in Selys 1853; Calopteryx elegans Hagen in Selys, 1853

= Calopteryx angustipennis =

Species of damselfly

Calopteryx angustipennis is a species of damselfly in the family Calopterygidae known commonly as the Appalachian jewelwing. It is endemic to the United States, where it occurs in the southeastern and eastern states.

== Description ==
The Appalachian jewelwing ranges in size from 50 to 67 millimeters (2 to 2.6 inches), making it the largest of the jewelwing damselflies. It is distinguishable from other jewelwing species by the absence of dark coloration on the wings. Both males and females have a metallic green thorax and abdomen, black legs, and clear or amber colored wings with green veins along the upper edge. In females, the abdomen coloration is less vibrant, with an especially dull tip, and some areas of the thorax are pale brown.

== Distribution and habitat ==
The Appalachian jewelwing is found near rocky rivers and large streams throughout the southeastern and eastern United States, from Alabama to New York. It particularly favors woodland habitats with cold, fast-flowing water.

== Ecology and behavior ==
The flight season, when adults emerge in their mature winged form and take flight, begins between April and May and ends between June and August, varying by locale. The Appalachian jewelwing typically perches in a horizontal position on riffles or vegetation along banks, often in small, scattered groups.
