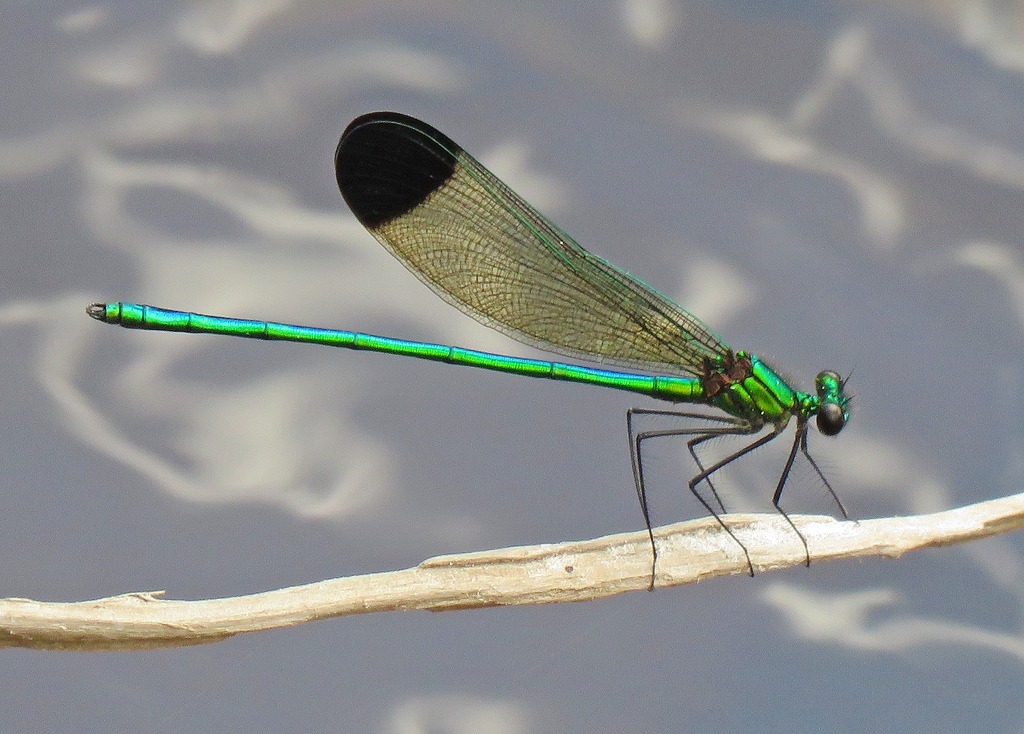

Conservation status
- Secure (NatureServe)

Scientific classification
- Kingdom: Animalia
- Phylum: Arthropoda
- Class: Insecta
- Order: Odonata
- Suborder: Zygoptera
- Family: Calopterygidae
- Genus: Calopteryx
- Species: C. dimidiata

Binomial name
- Calopteryx dimidiata Burmeister, 1839

Synonyms
- Calopteryx apicalis

= Calopteryx dimidiata =

Species of damselfly

Calopteryx dimidiata, the sparkling jewelwing, is a species of damselfly in the family Calopterygidae. It is endemic to the eastern and southeastern United States. Its natural habitat is woodland and open areas near forest rivers and streams.

== Description ==
The sparkling jewelwing is one of the smallest damselflies in its family with a total length of 37 to 50 millimetres (1.5 to 2.0 in). The thorax and the long slender abdomen are metallic bluish-green and the eyes are brown. In males the end fifth of each wing is black, with a straight line separating the dark section from the transparent hyaline remainder of the wing. Females are a slightly more bronzy-green. Their wings may be similar to those of the male but less clearly defined, or only the hind wings may be tipped with black, or the wings may be entirely clear. There is usually a small white pterostigma near the tip of the wings. Immature adults have reddish eyes and generally duller colouring.

The male sparkling jewelwing has fore-wings and hind wings that do not differ in size by more than 2 millimetres (0.08 in). The apex of both pairs of wing has a black band that terminates in a straight line distal to the nodus. The sternum of the tenth abdominal segment is black. These features distinguish this species from the others in its genus that share its range.

== Distribution and habitat ==
The sparkling jewelwing is found in the eastern and southeastern United States. Its range extends from New England to Louisiana and parts of Texas, mainly on the Atlantic coastal plain. Its typical habitat is sandy forest streams, particularly acidic ones, with fast-flowing water in locations with plentiful riverside vegetation.

== Ecology ==
The sparkling jewelwing is on the wing between May and September in New Jersey but between February and November in Florida. Both males and females can often be seen together near breeding sites, with males patrolling small territories, circling and chasing off rivals. When a female is present, ritualised courtship flights precede copulation which lasts for about two minutes. After this, the female walks down the stem of an emergent plant and spends about fifteen minutes underwater, laying a batch of several hundred eggs before returning to the surface.
