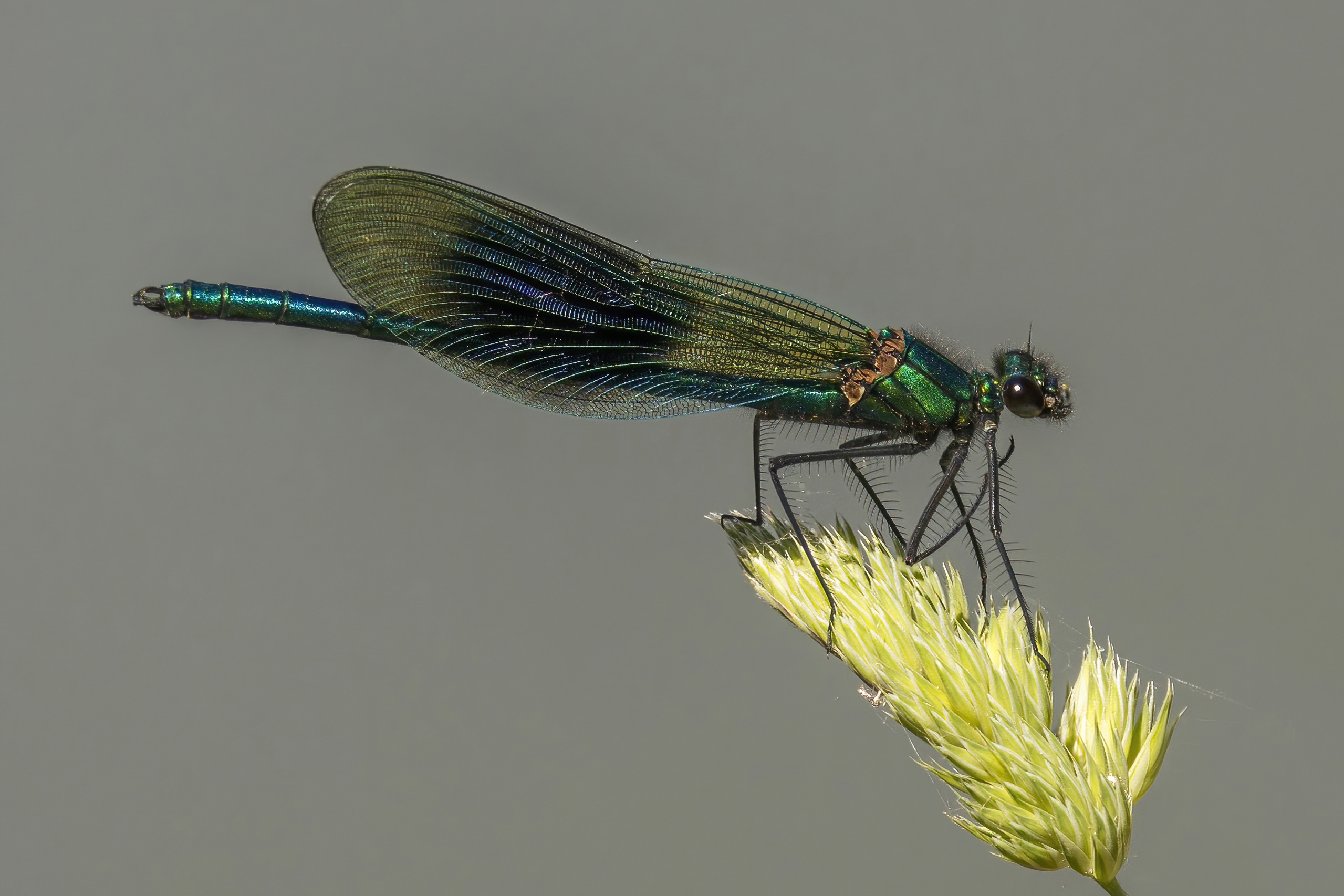
- Male
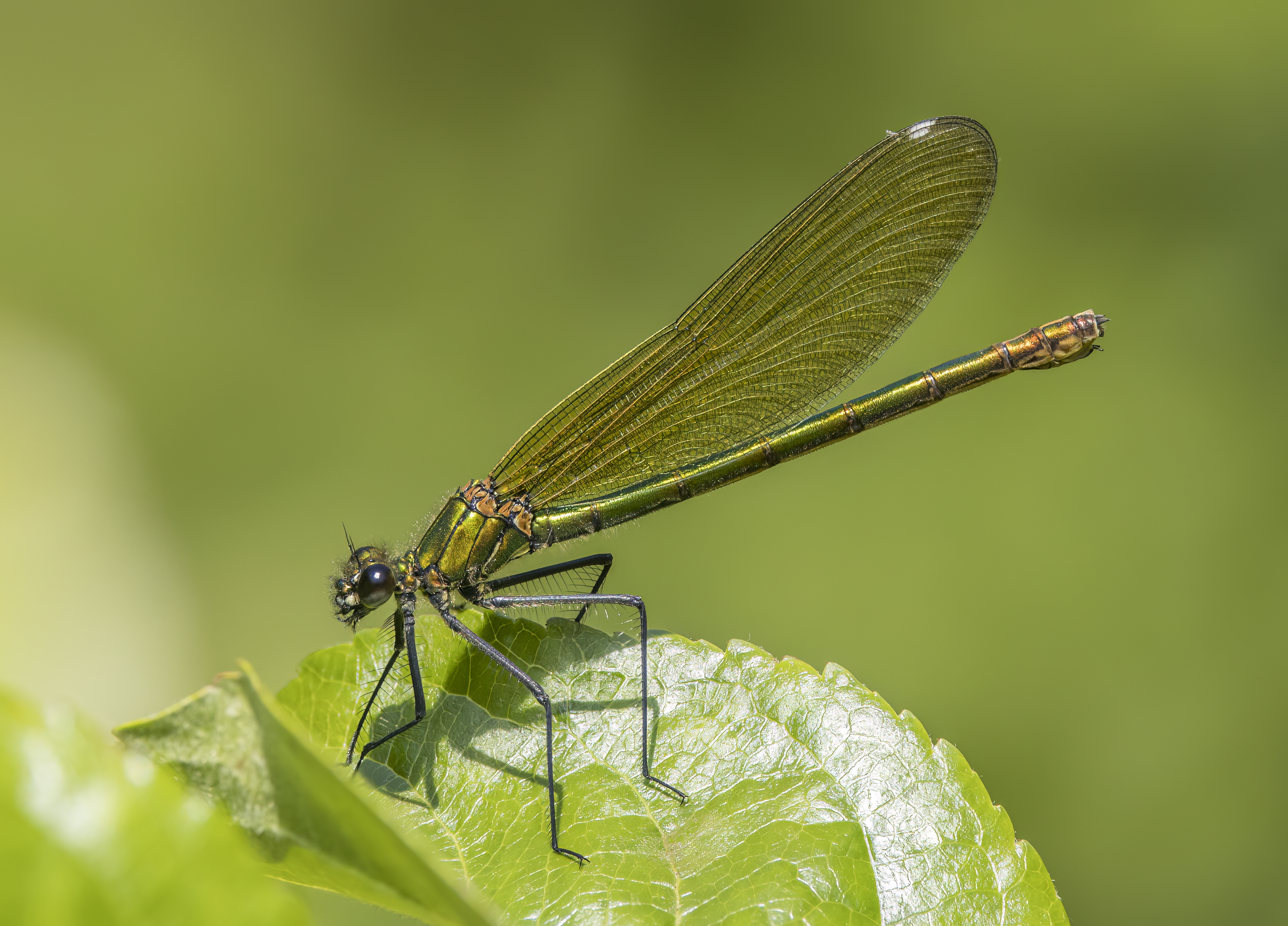
- Female

Conservation status
- Least Concern (IUCN 3.1)

Scientific classification
- Kingdom: Animalia
- Phylum: Arthropoda
- Clade: Pancrustacea
- Class: Insecta
- Order: Odonata
- Suborder: Zygoptera
- Family: Calopterygidae
- Genus: Calopteryx
- Species: C. splendens

Binomial name
- Calopteryx splendens (Harris, 1780)

Synonyms
- List: Agrio cellaris Selys, 1831; Agrio virescens Selys, 1831; Agrion parthenias Charpentier, 1840; Agrion splendens (Harris, 1780); Agrion splendens subsp. erevanense Akramowski, 1948; Calopteryx amasina Bartenev, 1912; Calopteryx intermedia subsp. cecilia Bartenev, 1912; Calopteryx intermedia subsp. persica Bartenev, 1912; Calopteryx ludoviciana Leach, 1815; Calopteryx parthenias Burmeister, 1839; Calopteryx splendens subsp. ancilla Selys, 1853; Calopteryx splendens subsp. balcanica Fudakowski, 1930; Calopteryx splendens subsp. caprai Conci, 1956; Calopteryx splendens subsp. cartvelica Bartenev, 1930; Calopteryx splendens subsp. ciscaucasica Bartenev, 1925; Calopteryx splendens subsp. cretensis Pongracz, 1911; Calopteryx splendens subsp. intermedia Selys, 1887; Calopteryx splendens subsp. johanseni Belyshev, 1955; Calopteryx splendens subsp. mingrelica Selys, 1869; Calopteryx splendens subsp. njuja Kosterin & Sivtseva, 2009; Calopteryx splendens subsp. pseudosyriaca Buchholz, 1955; Calopteryx splendens subsp. taurica Selys, 1853; Calopteryx splendens subsp. tschaldirica Bartenev, 1909; Calopteryx splendens subsp. tuempeli Scholtz, 1908; Calopteryx splendens subsp. waterstoni Schneider, 1984; Coenagrion splendens (Harris, 1780); Libellula ludovicea Fourcroy, 1785; Libellula splendens Harris, 1780

= Banded demoiselle =

Species of damselfly

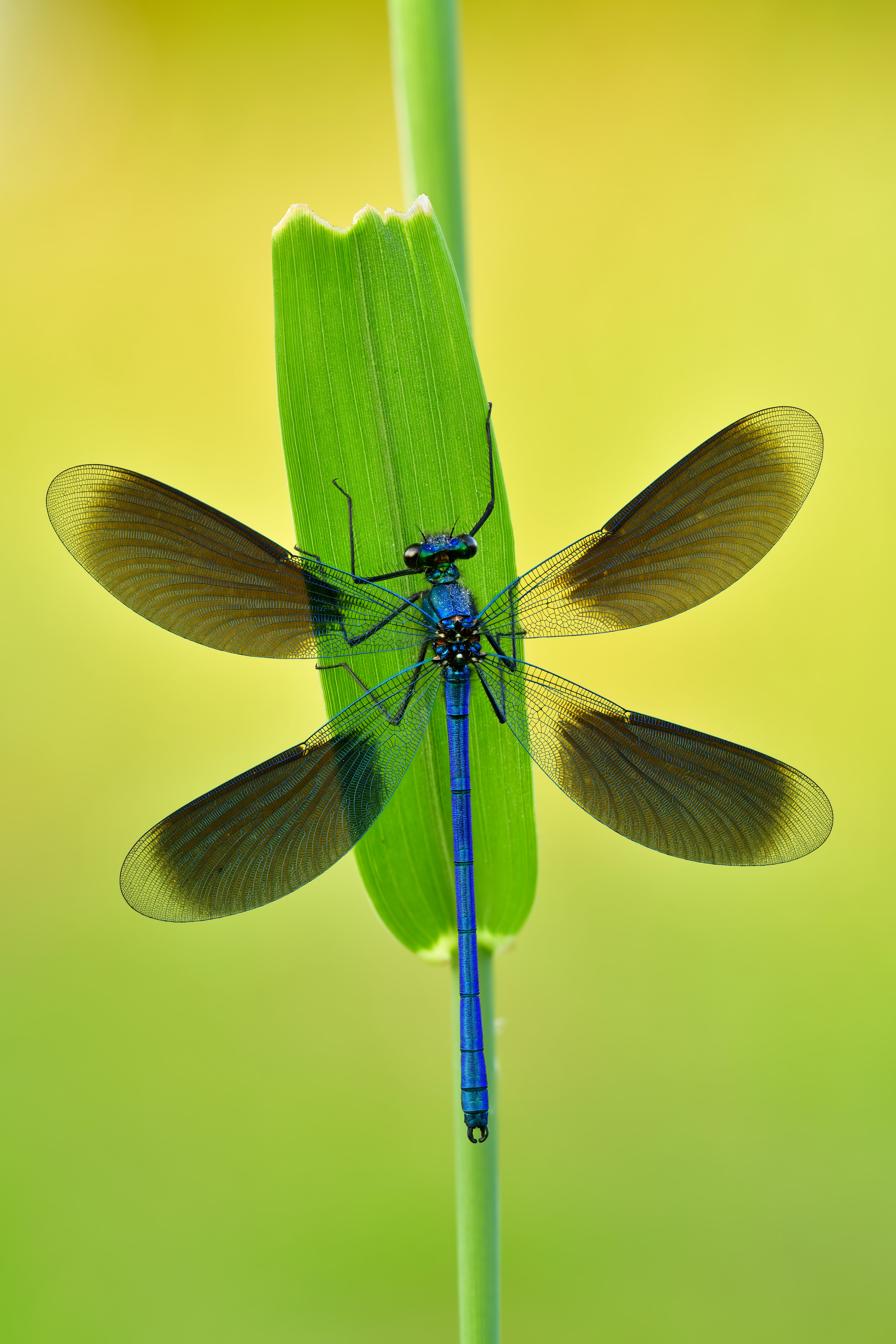
Male

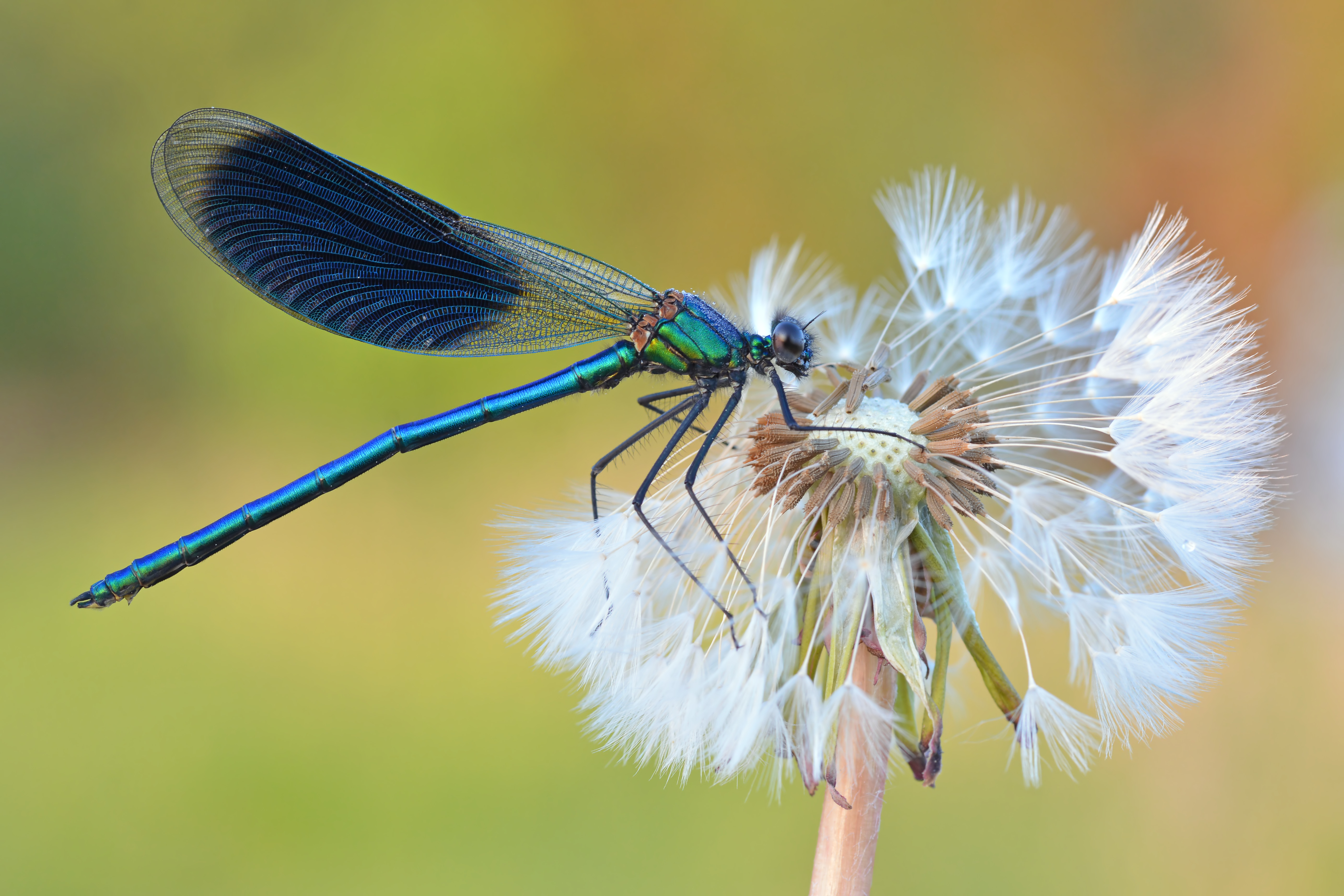
Banded demoiselle

The banded demoiselle (Calopteryx splendens) is a species of damselfly belonging to the family Calopterygidae. It is often found along slow-flowing streams and rivers. It is a Eurasian species occurring from the Atlantic coast eastwards to Lake Baikal and northwestern China.

This is a common species throughout much of its range.

== Description ==
This is a large damselfly with a total length of up to 48 millimetres (1.9 in) and a hindwing length of up to 36 millimetres (1.4 in).

Male and female are variable in color and pattern. The male has translucent wings which each have a broad, dark iridescent blue-black spot (or band) across the outer part. On immature individuals the spot is dark brown. The body can be a metallic blue or bluish green or a combination of both colours, depending on the time of year and location.

The dark wing patch of the male starts at the nodus (the slight dip midway down the upper edge of the wing) but can reach up to the wing-tip in southern races. In the very similar beautiful demoiselle (Calopteryx virgo), the dark patch starts before the nodus.

The female has translucent, pale green iridescent wings with a white patch near the tip (a pseudopterostigma), and a metallic green or bronze/green body.

== Eggs and larvae ==
Females can lay up to 10 eggs per minute for 45 minutes. They lay in a wide variety of emergent or floating plants, sometimes even submerging to do so.

The eggs hatch after 14 days. The larvae have very long legs and are stick-shaped. They develop over two years, usually. They tolerate muddy water and overwinter buried in mud. When they are ready to moult into an adult, they climb up a suitable reed or plant and shed their skin.

== Habitat ==
This species lives in many types of freshwater habitat, particularly open running water bodies such as streams and smaller rivers.

== Behaviour ==
Males are usually territorial, but large numbers can sometimes be found in lush bankside plants and on floating objects. They court females by opening their wings and performing an aerial dance. They are usually found in canals and quiet rivers with muddy bottoms located in open country.

== Range ==
The banded demoiselle is a Eurasian species, and is present throughout Eurasia from the Atlantic coast to Lake Baikal and north-western China. It occurs in Taganay and Zyuratkul National Parks of Russia. It can be found at Fruška Gora in Serbia. It's found throughout the British Isles, except for the Scottish Highlands.

== Gallery ==
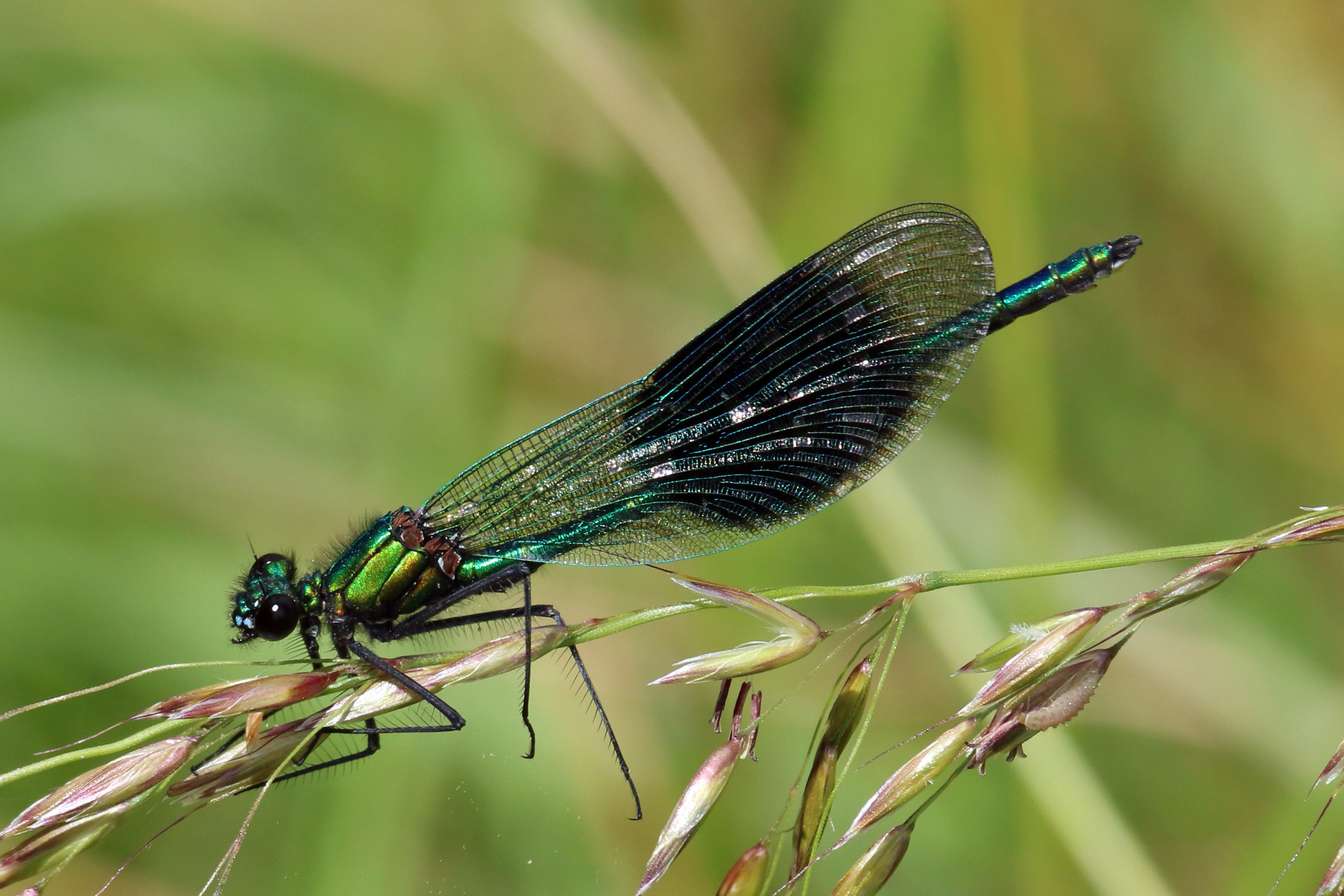
Blue-green male

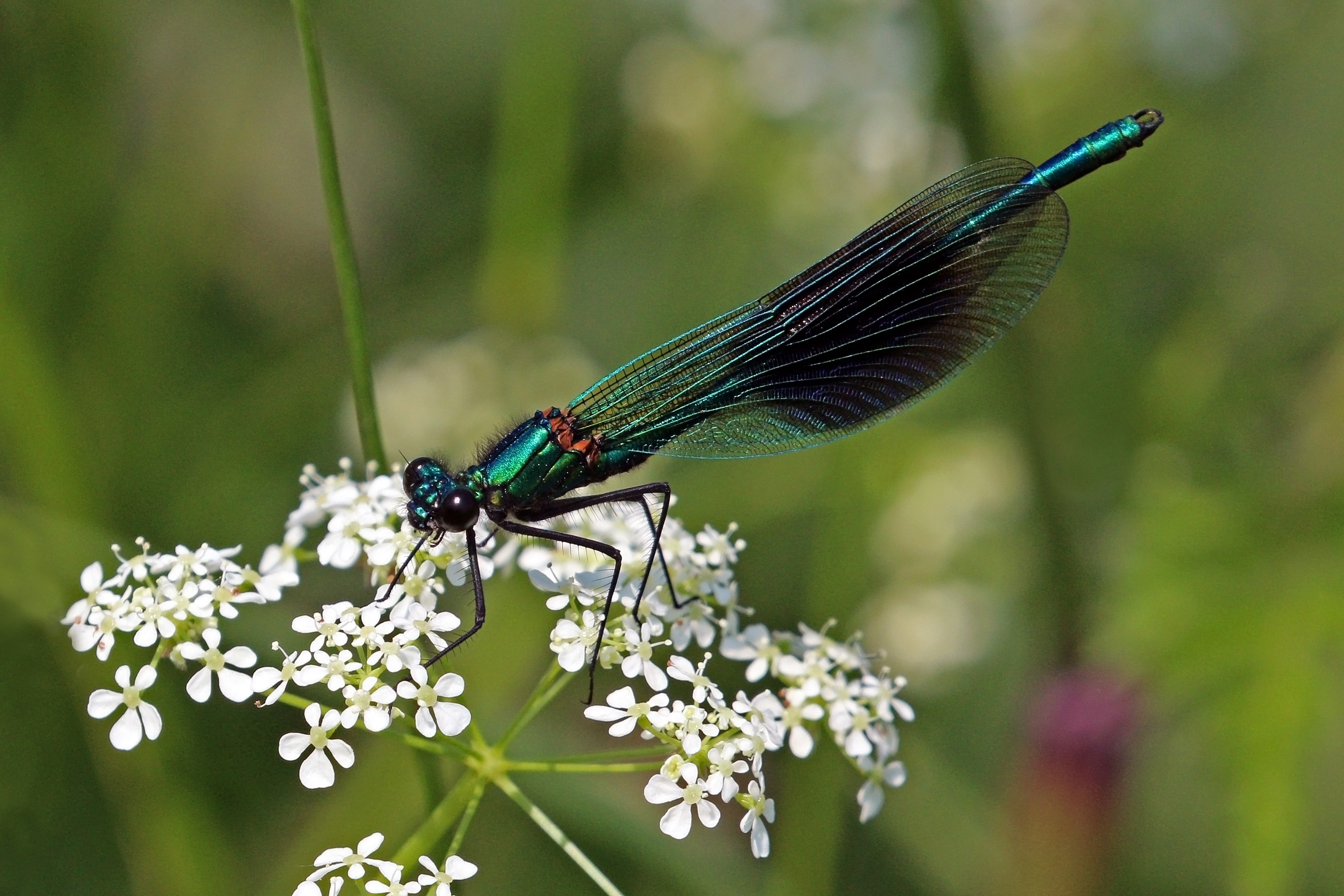
Green male

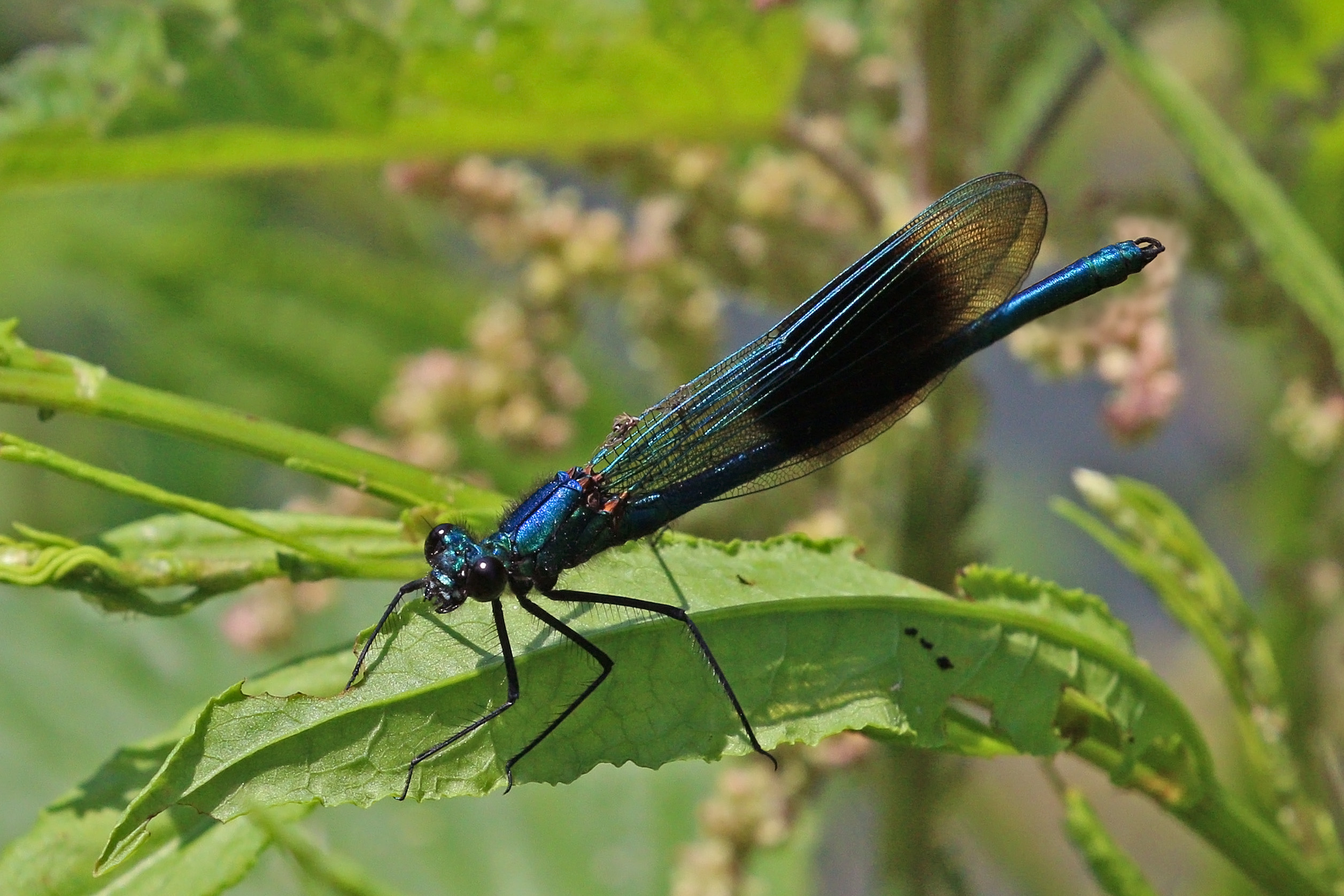
Blue male

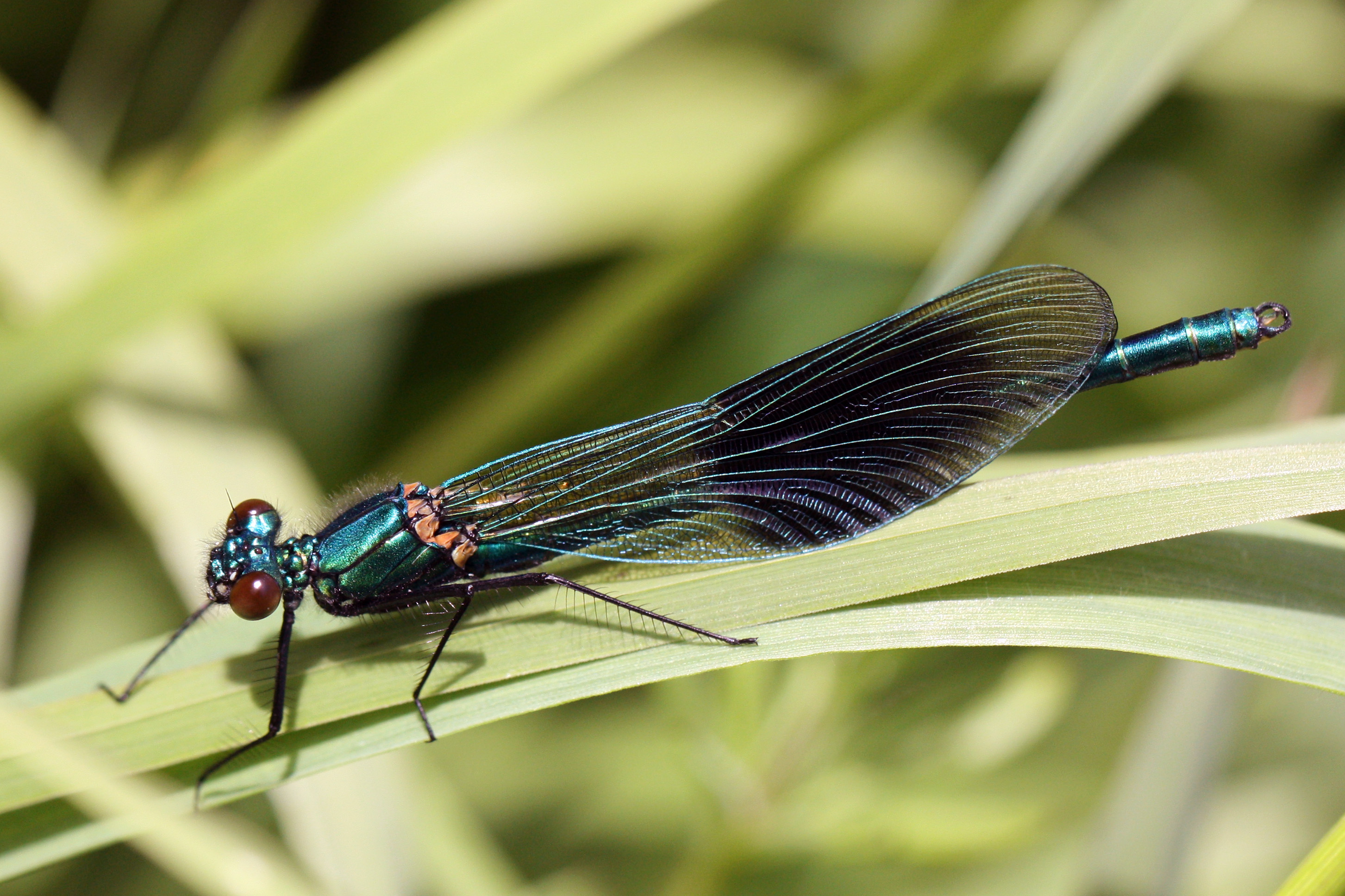
Red eyes of juvenile male

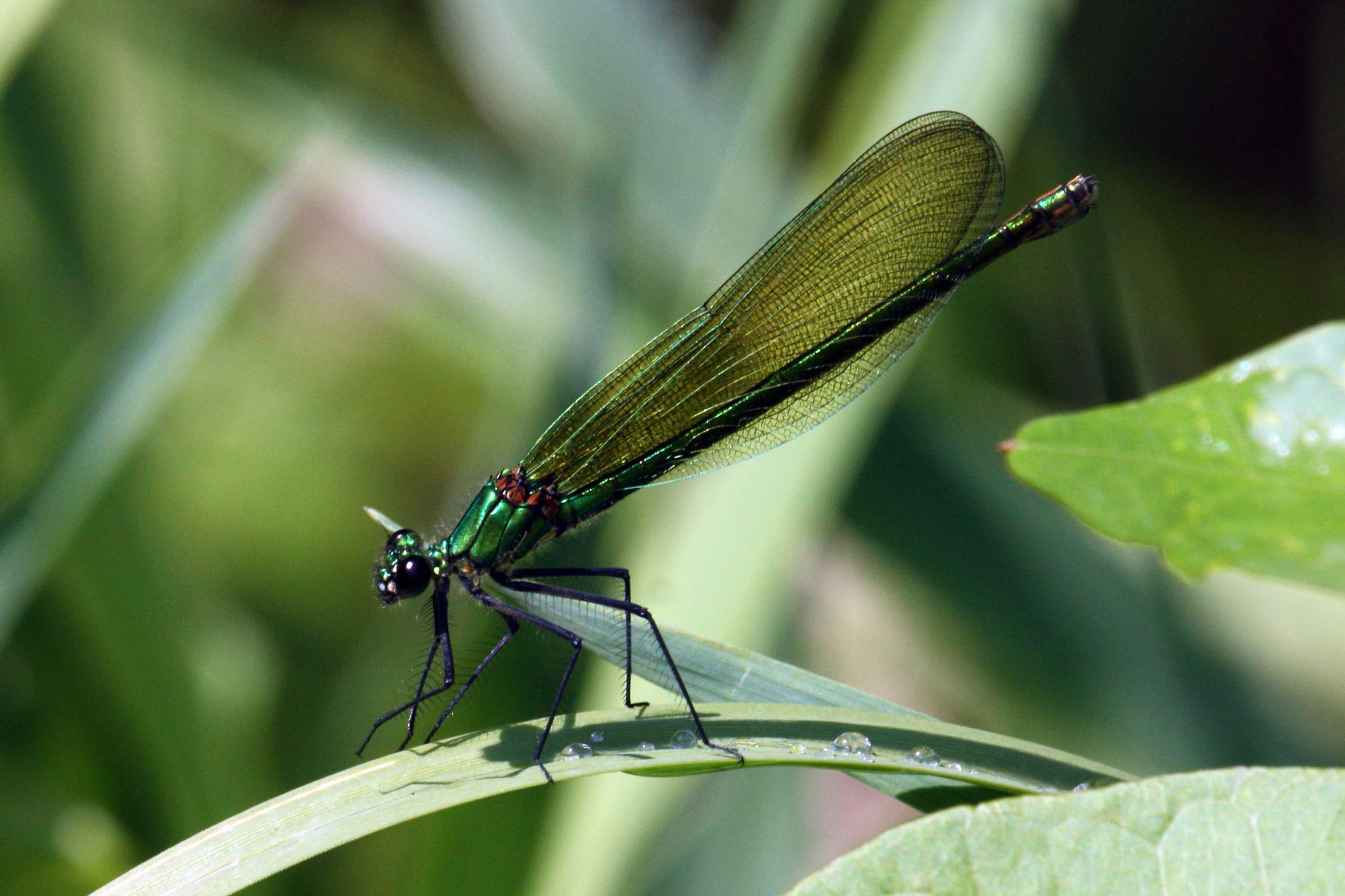
Female with no pseudostigmata

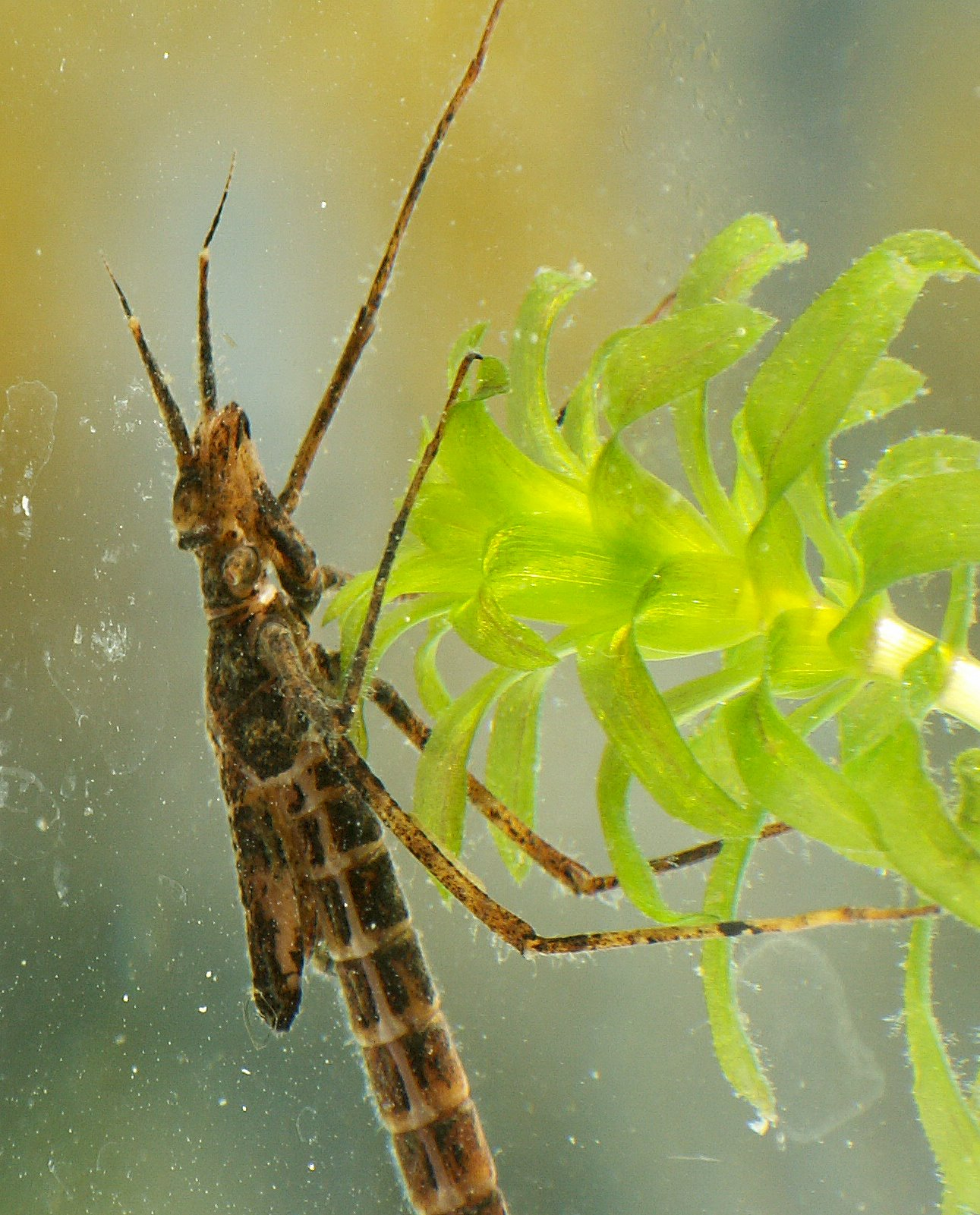
Larva

Male Calopteryx splendens

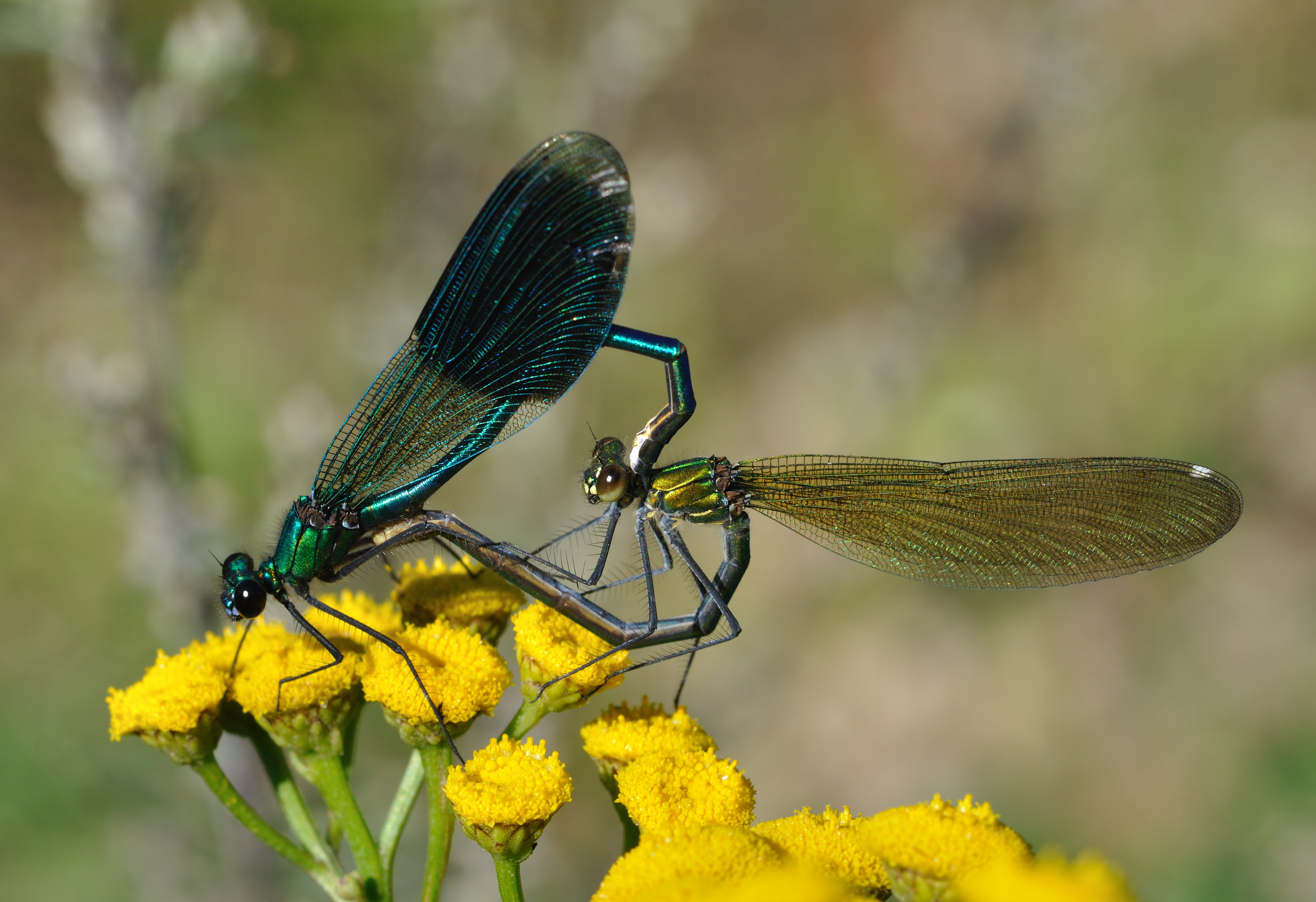
Mating wheel
