= Atrocalopteryx auco =

Scientific classification
- Domain: Eukaryota
- Kingdom: Animalia
- Phylum: Arthropoda
- Class: Insecta
- Order: Odonata
- Suborder: Zygoptera
- Family: Calopterygidae
- Subfamily: Calopteryginae
- Tribe: Calopterygini
- Genus: Atrocalopteryx
- Species: A. auco

Binomial name
- Atrocalopteryx auco Hämäläinen, 2014

Species of damselfly

Atrocalopteryx auco is a species of broad-winged damselfly in the family Calopterygidae.
