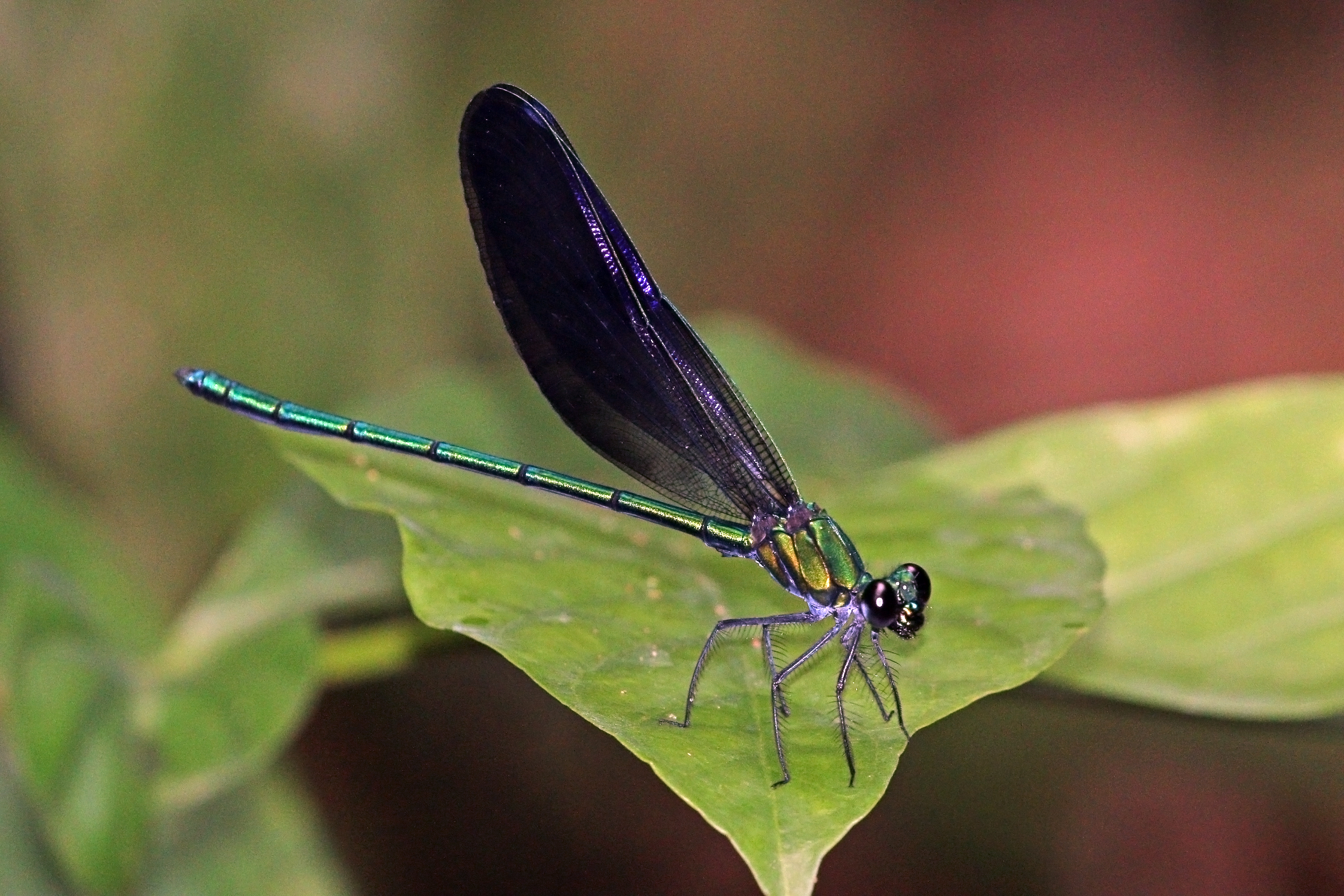

Scientific classification
- Kingdom: Animalia
- Phylum: Arthropoda
- Class: Insecta
- Order: Odonata
- Suborder: Zygoptera
- Family: Calopterygidae
- Genus: Sapho
- Species: S. ciliata

Binomial name
- Sapho ciliata (Fabricius, 1781)

= Sapho ciliata =

Species of damselfly

Sapho ciliata, also known by its common name western bluewing is a species of damselfly from the genus Sapho. The species was first described in 1781.
