= Atrocalopteryx laosica =

Conservation status
- Data Deficient (IUCN 3.1)

Scientific classification
- Kingdom: Animalia
- Phylum: Arthropoda
- Class: Insecta
- Order: Odonata
- Suborder: Zygoptera
- Family: Calopterygidae
- Subfamily: Calopteryginae
- Tribe: Calopterygini
- Genus: Atrocalopteryx
- Species: A. laosica

Binomial name
- Atrocalopteryx laosica (Fraser, 1933)

Synonyms
- Calopteryx laosica

Species of damselfly

Atrocalopteryx laosica is a species of broad-winged damselfly in the family Calopterygidae.
