= Echo perornata =

Scientific classification
- Domain: Eukaryota
- Kingdom: Animalia
- Phylum: Arthropoda
- Class: Insecta
- Order: Odonata
- Suborder: Zygoptera
- Family: Calopterygidae
- Subfamily: Calopteryginae
- Tribe: Mnaisini
- Genus: Echo
- Species: E. perornata

Binomial name
- Echo perornata Yu & Hämäläinen, 2012

Species of damselfly

Echo perornata is a species of broad-winged damselfly in the family Calopterygidae.
