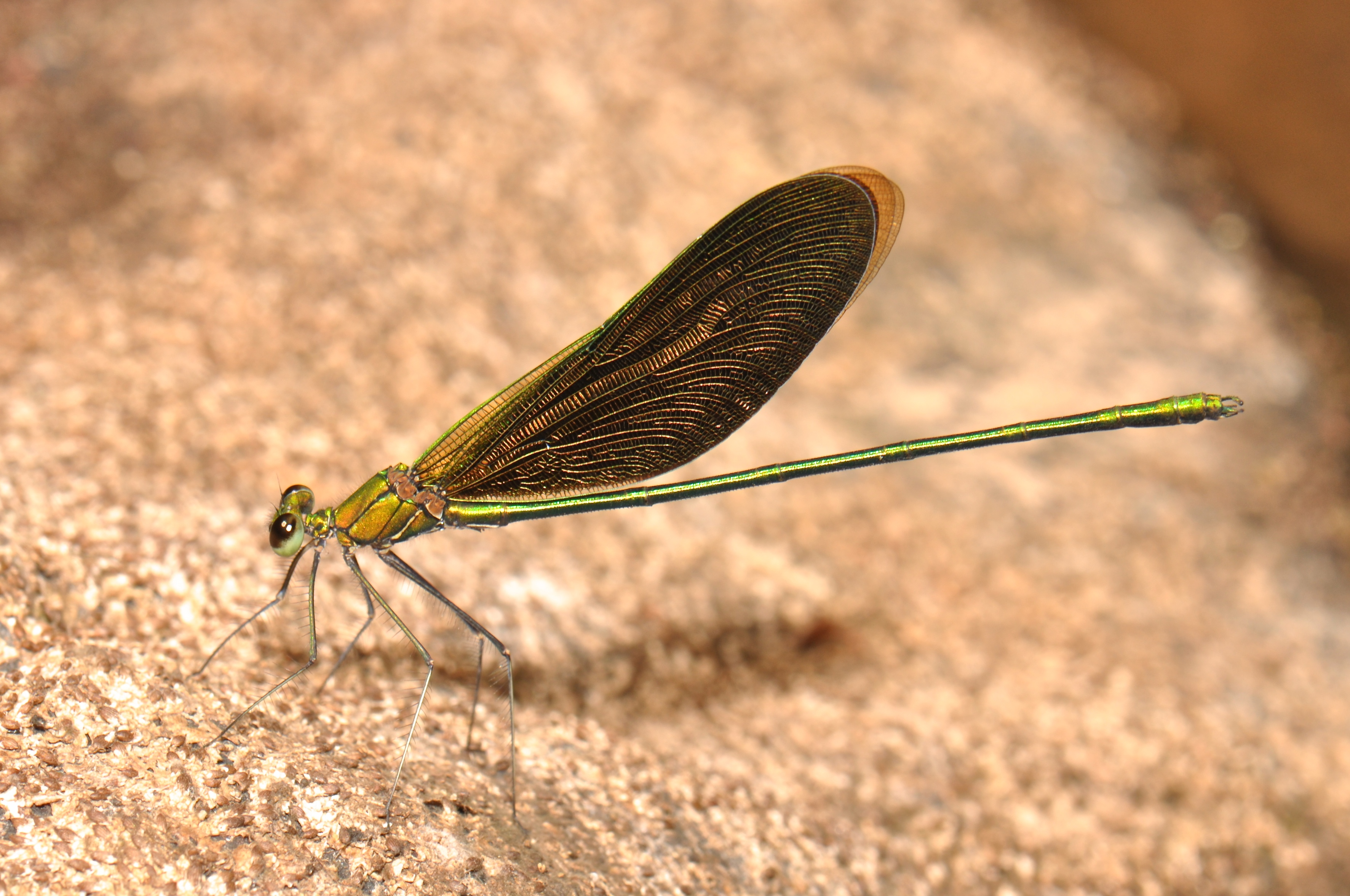
- Neurobasis australis

Scientific classification
- Kingdom: Animalia
- Phylum: Arthropoda
- Clade: Pancrustacea
- Class: Insecta
- Order: Odonata
- Suborder: Zygoptera
- Family: Calopterygidae
- Genus: Neurobasis
- Species: N. australis

Binomial name
- Neurobasis australis Selys, 1897

Synonyms
- Neurobasis leopoldi Fraser, 1932

= Neurobasis australis =

Papuan demoiselle

Species of damselfly

Neurobasis australis is a species of damselfly in the family Calopterygidae, commonly known as a Papuan demoiselle. It is a large, metallic green damselfly with long legs, and dark wings without pterostigma. It has been recorded from New Guinea, and Indonesia, where it inhabits streams.

== Etymology ==
The genus name Neurobasis is derived from the Greek νεῦρον (neuron, "nerve" or "wing vein") and βάσις (basis, "base" or "foundation"), referring to the unusual vein configuration of the wings.

The species name australis is Latin for "southern", referring to a southern representative of that group.

== Gallery ==
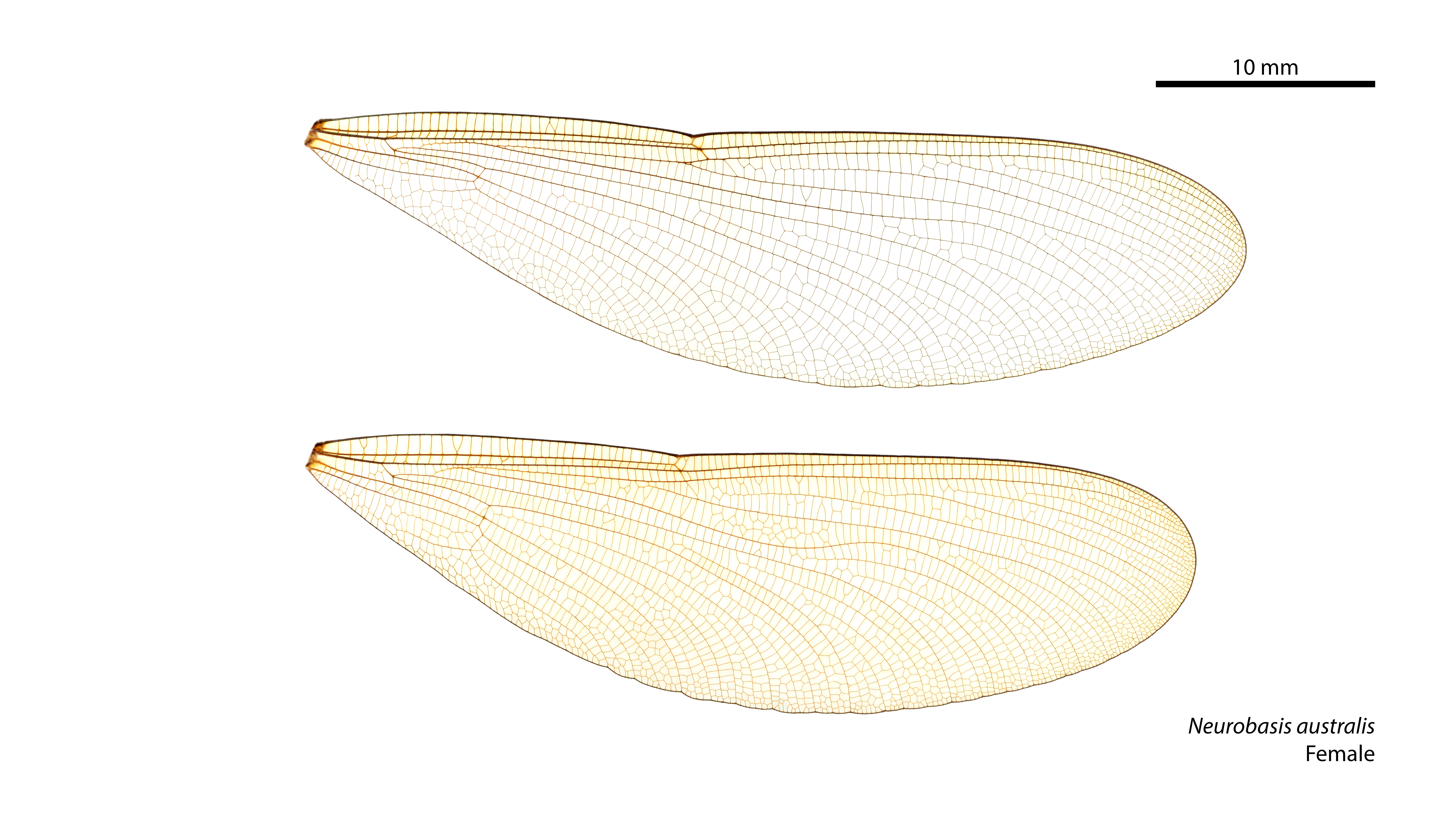
Female wings

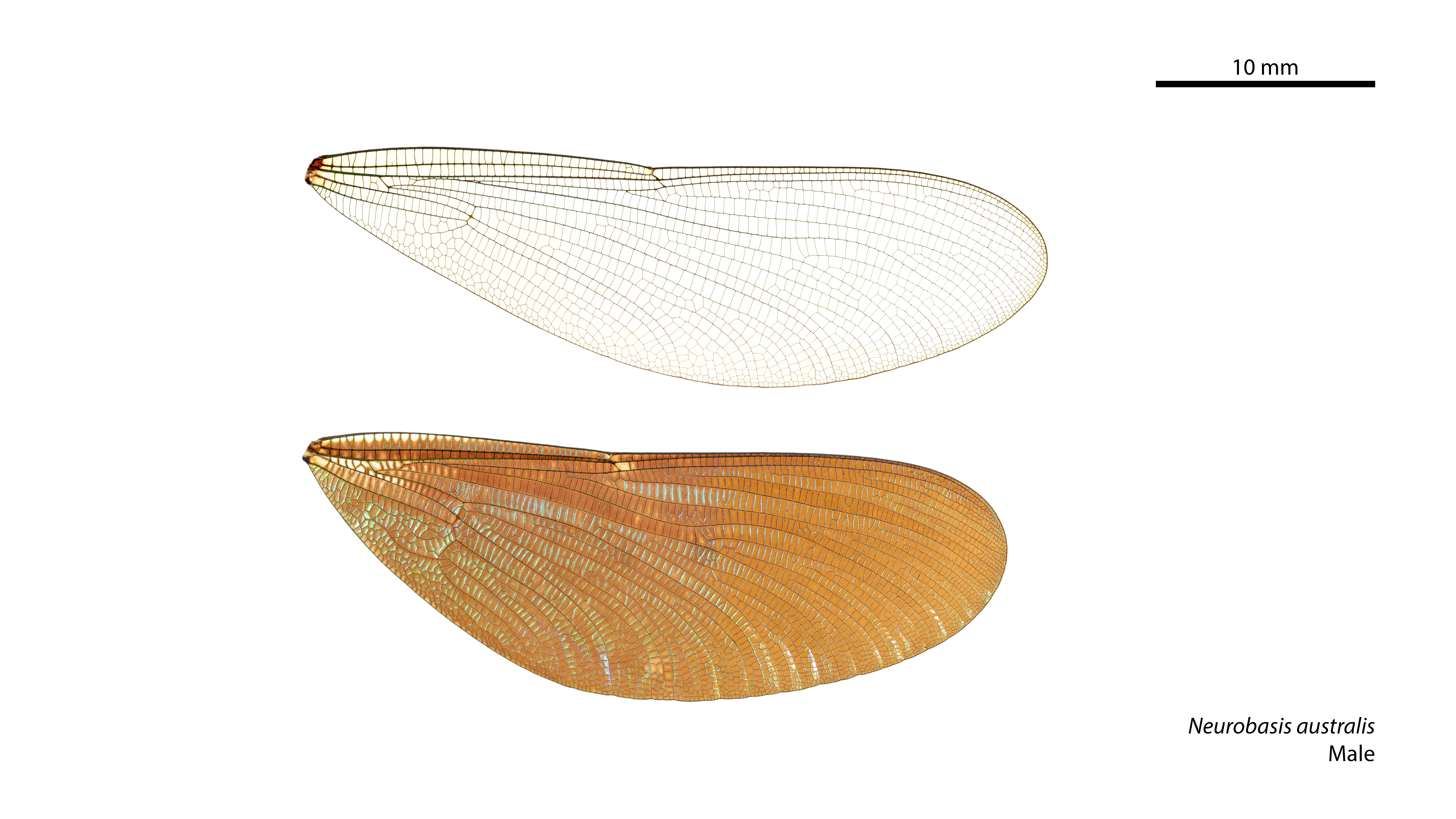
Male wings

== Notes ==
Early records of Neurobasis australis in Australia have not been confirmed.
