= Iridictyon trebbaui =

Conservation status
- Least Concern (IUCN 3.1)

Scientific classification
- Kingdom: Animalia
- Phylum: Arthropoda
- Clade: Pancrustacea
- Class: Insecta
- Order: Odonata
- Suborder: Zygoptera
- Family: Calopterygidae
- Genus: Iridictyon
- Species: I. trebbaui

Binomial name
- Iridictyon trebbaui Rácenis, 1968

Species of damselfly

Iridictyon trebbaui is a species of broad-winged damselfly in the family Calopterygidae. It is found only on the tepuis of Venezuela and Guyana at elevations of 300–1,300 m (980–4,270 ft) above sea level.

Iridictyon trebbaui has a restricted range and is only known from a few locations. However, its range is protected by a number of protected areas (e.g., Canaima National Park) and there are no threats to its habitat.
