= Umma declivium =

Conservation status
- Vulnerable (IUCN 3.1)

Scientific classification
- Kingdom: Animalia
- Phylum: Arthropoda
- Class: Insecta
- Order: Odonata
- Suborder: Zygoptera
- Family: Calopterygidae
- Genus: Umma
- Species: U. declivium

Binomial name
- Umma declivium Förster, 1906

Species of damselfly

Umma declivium is a species of damselfly in the family Calopterygidae. It is found in Malawi and Tanzania. Its natural habitats are subtropical or tropical moist lowland forests and rivers. It is threatened by habitat loss.
