= Atrocalopteryx melli =

Conservation status
- Least Concern (IUCN 3.1)

Scientific classification
- Kingdom: Animalia
- Phylum: Arthropoda
- Class: Insecta
- Order: Odonata
- Suborder: Zygoptera
- Family: Calopterygidae
- Genus: Atrocalopteryx
- Species: A. melli

Binomial name
- Atrocalopteryx melli (Ris, 1912)

Synonyms
- Calopteryx melli

Species of damselfly

Atrocalopteryx melli is a species of broad-winged damselfly in the family Calopterygidae.

The IUCN conservation status of Atrocalopteryx melli is "LC", least concern, with no immediate threat to the species' survival. The IUCN status was reviewed in 2010.
