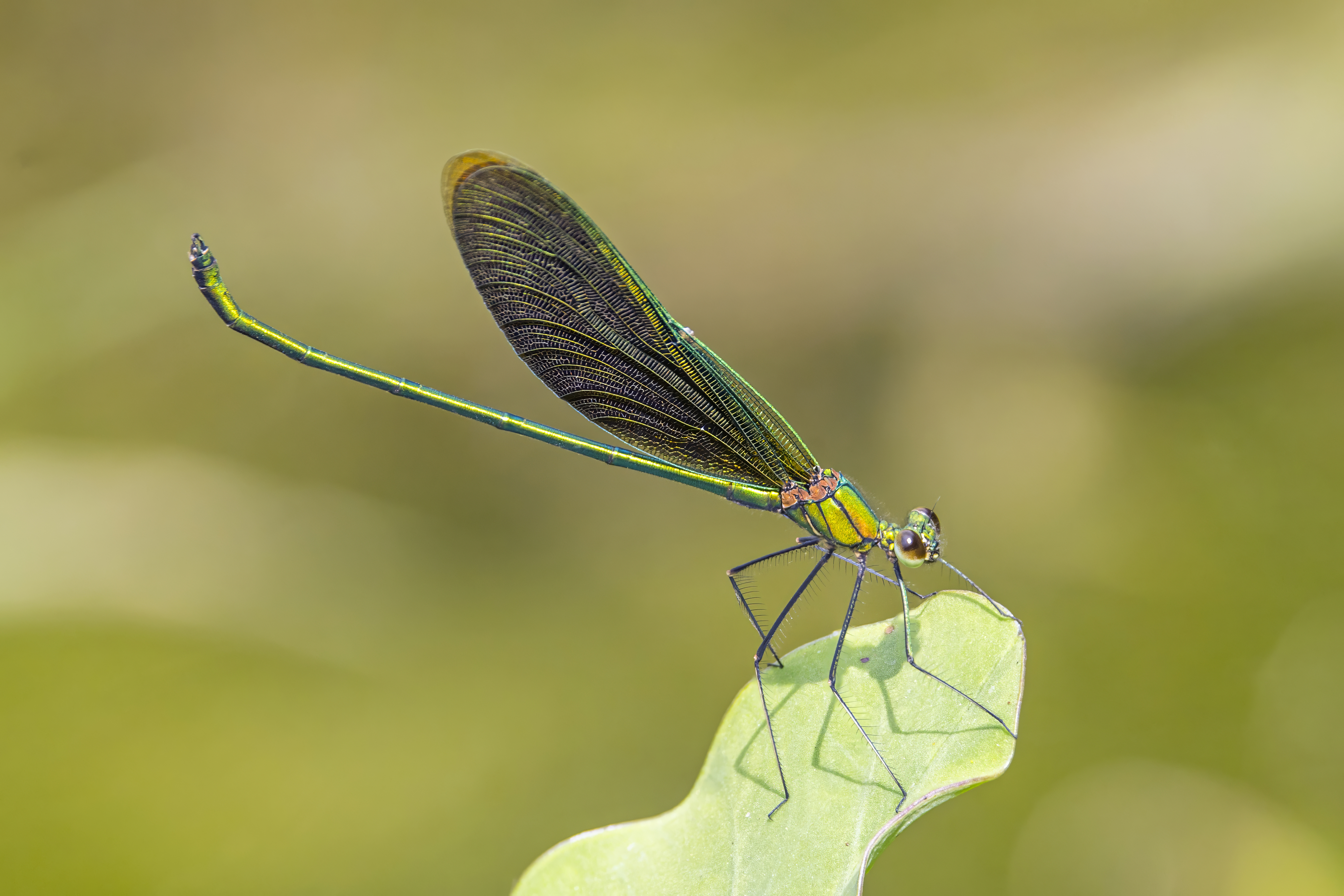
- male
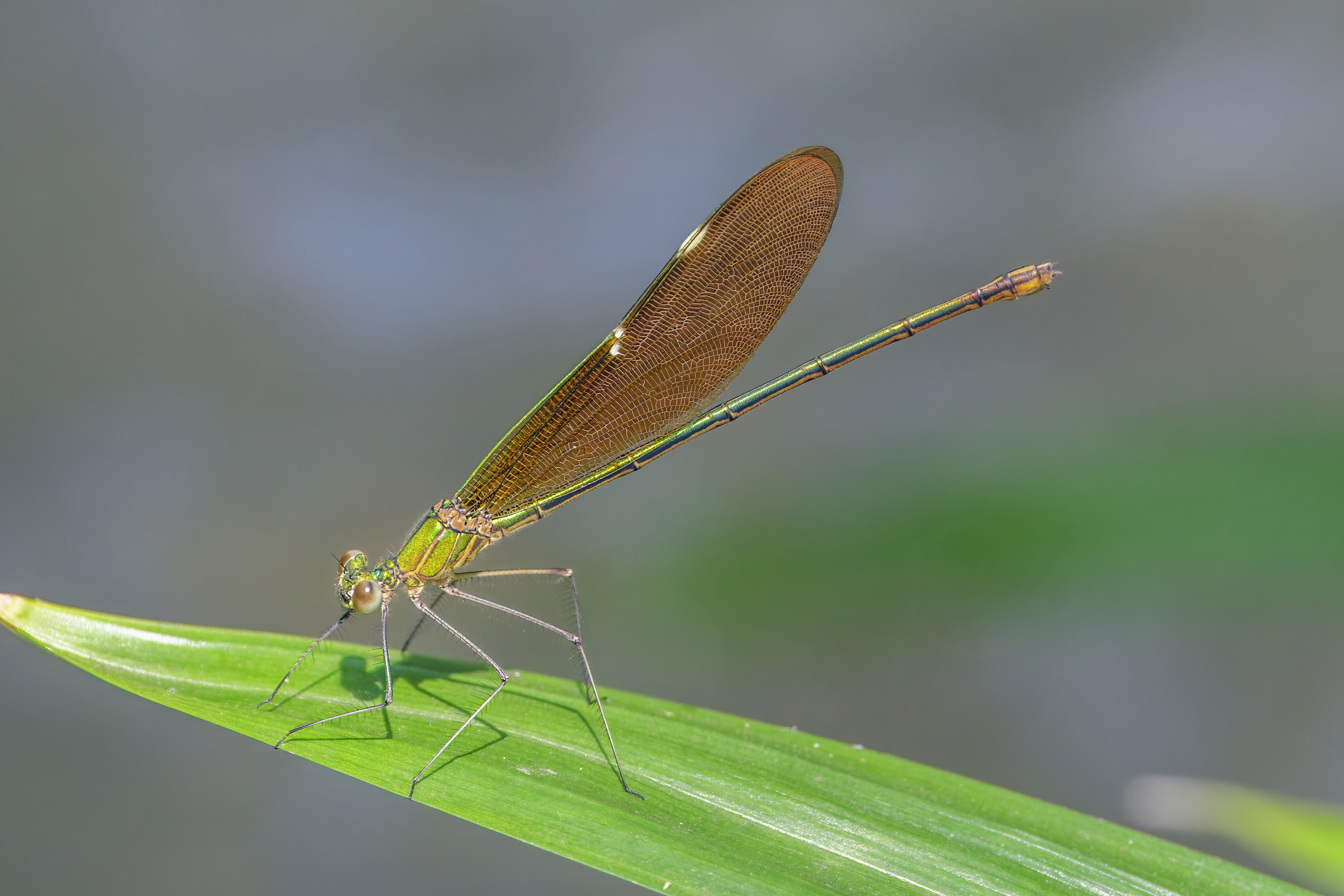
- female both in Laos

Conservation status
- Least Concern (IUCN 3.1)

Scientific classification
- Kingdom: Animalia
- Phylum: Arthropoda
- Clade: Pancrustacea
- Class: Insecta
- Order: Odonata
- Suborder: Zygoptera
- Family: Calopterygidae
- Genus: Neurobasis
- Species: N. chinensis

Binomial name
- Neurobasis chinensis (Linnaeus, 1758)

Synonyms
- Agrion nobilitata Fabricius, 1776; Calopteryx disparilis Rambur, 1842; Calopteryx sinensis Walker, 1853

= Neurobasis chinensis =

Species of damselfly

Neurobasis chinensis, stream glory is a species of damselfly in the family Calopterygidae. It is a common species distributed across much of Asia.

== Description and habitat ==
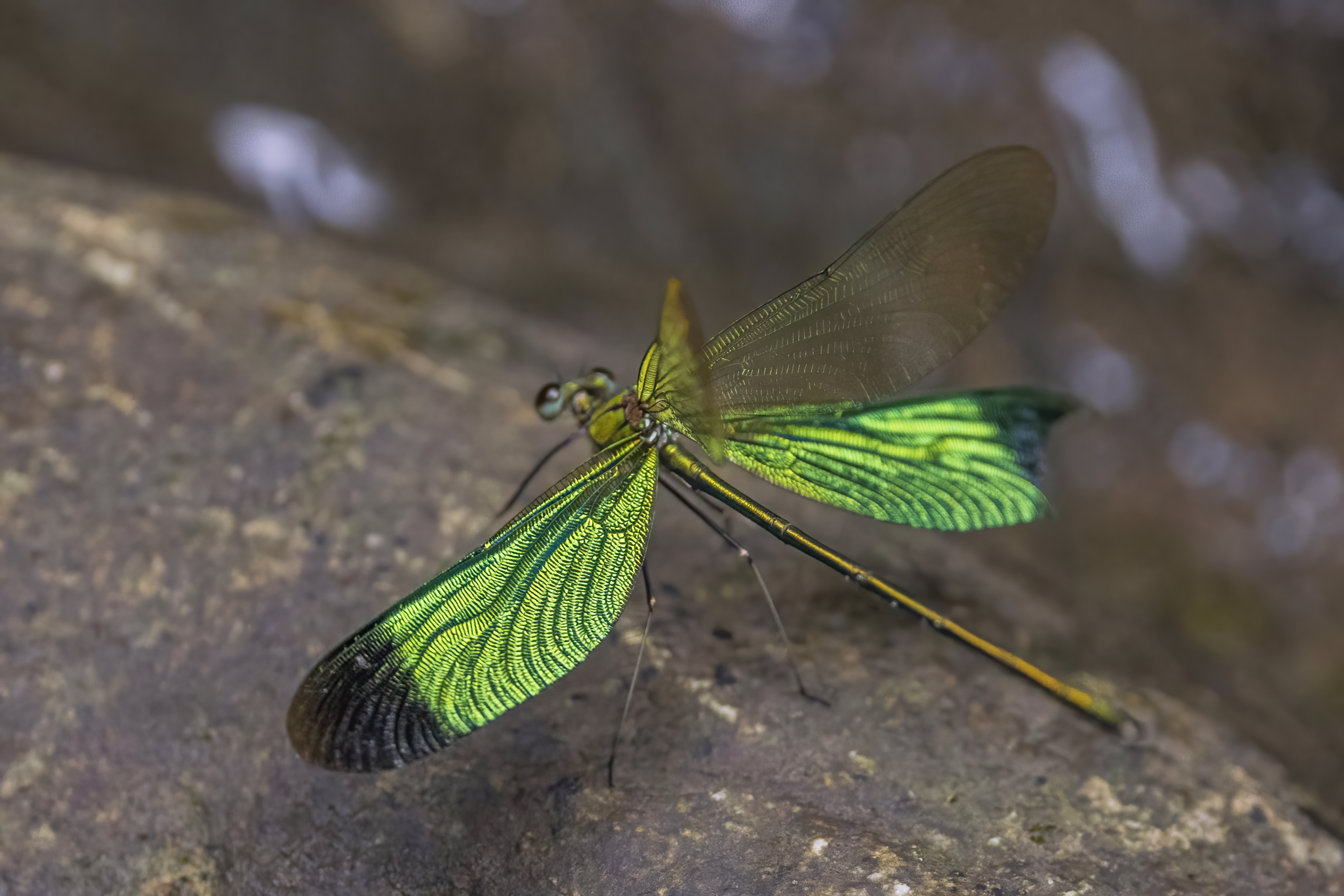
male flashing rear wing

It is a large metallic bronze-green colored damselfly. Its fore-wings are transparent, tinted in pale yellow with green neuration. Its hind-wings are opaque in brilliant metallic green or peacock-blue according to angle of view. They flash the wings, displaying the colors to attract females. The colour is produced by interference from the thin surfaces of the wing membrane. Female is very similar to the male. But its wings are transparent and light coffee brown with white wings spots. There are another creamy yellow patches at the nodes.

This species breeds in forest streams. The males maintain their territories along stretches of moderately fast-flowing streams. Normally found only near the water bodies. Female lays eggs in submerged vegetation, often among root masses. The naiads burrow in sediment underwater and have a long abdomen that is held recurved above the body.

== See also ==
- List of odonates of India
- List of odonata of Kerala
