= Umma saphirina =

Conservation status
- Least Concern (IUCN 3.1)

Scientific classification
- Kingdom: Animalia
- Phylum: Arthropoda
- Class: Insecta
- Order: Odonata
- Suborder: Zygoptera
- Family: Calopterygidae
- Genus: Umma
- Species: U. saphirina

Binomial name
- Umma saphirina Förster, 1916

Species of damselfly

Umma saphirina is a species of damselfly in the family Calopterygidae. It is found in Cameroon, Central African Republic, the Republic of the Congo, the Democratic Republic of the Congo, Kenya, Nigeria, and Uganda. Its natural habitats are subtropical or tropical moist lowland forests and rivers.
