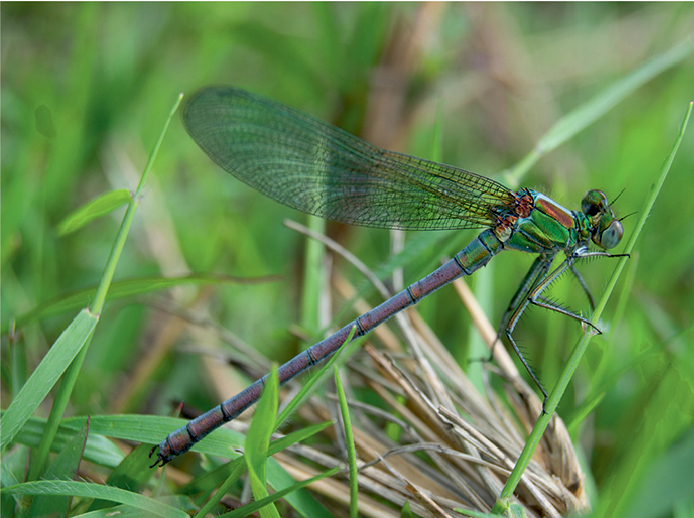

Conservation status
- Vulnerable (IUCN 3.1)

Scientific classification
- Kingdom: Animalia
- Phylum: Arthropoda
- Class: Insecta
- Order: Odonata
- Suborder: Zygoptera
- Family: Calopterygidae
- Genus: Umma
- Species: U. femina

Binomial name
- Umma femina Longfield, 1947

= Umma femina =

Species of damselfly

Umma femina is a species of damselfly in the family Calopterygidae. It is endemic to Angola. Its natural habitats are subtropical or tropical moist montane forests and rivers. It is threatened by habitat loss.
