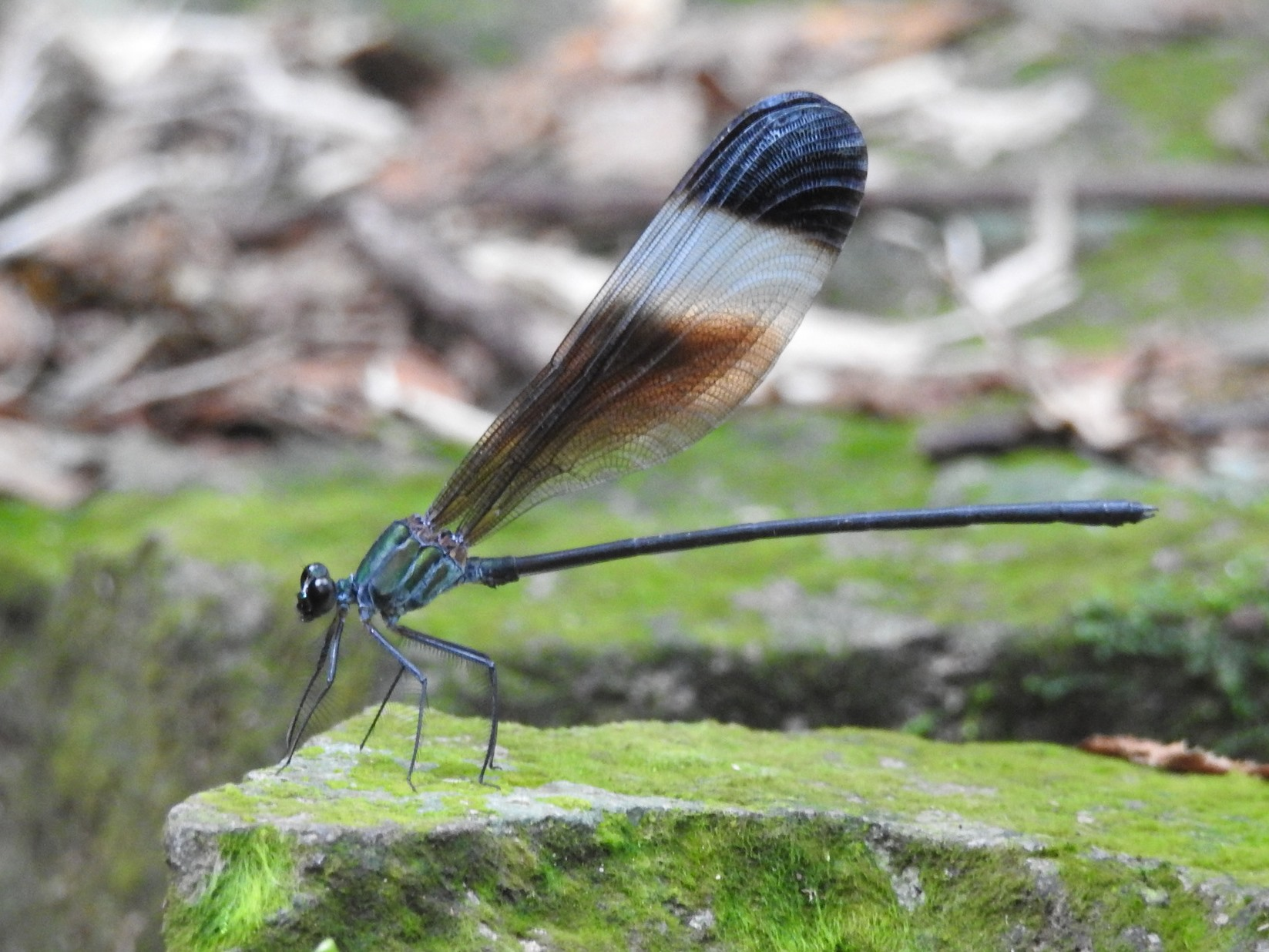

Scientific classification
- Domain: Eukaryota
- Kingdom: Animalia
- Phylum: Arthropoda
- Class: Insecta
- Order: Odonata
- Suborder: Zygoptera
- Family: Calopterygidae
- Genus: Psolodesmus
- Species: P. mandarinus

Binomial name
- Psolodesmus mandarinus MacLahlan, 1870

= Psolodesmus mandarinus =

Species of damselfly

Psolodesmus mandarinus is a species of broad-winged damselflies in the family Calopterygidae.
