= Atrocalopteryx atrocyana =

Conservation status
- Near Threatened (IUCN 3.1)

Scientific classification
- Kingdom: Animalia
- Phylum: Arthropoda
- Class: Insecta
- Order: Odonata
- Suborder: Zygoptera
- Family: Calopterygidae
- Genus: Atrocalopteryx
- Species: A. atrocyana

Binomial name
- Atrocalopteryx atrocyana (Fraser, 1935)

Species of damselfly

Atrocalopteryx atrocyana is a species of broad-winged damselfly in the family Calopterygidae.

The IUCN conservation status of Atrocalopteryx atrocyana is "NT", near threatened. The species may be considered threatened in the near future. The population is decreasing. The IUCN status was reviewed in 2011.
