= Atrocalopteryx coomani =

Conservation status
- Near Threatened (IUCN 3.1)

Scientific classification
- Kingdom: Animalia
- Phylum: Arthropoda
- Class: Insecta
- Order: Odonata
- Suborder: Zygoptera
- Family: Calopterygidae
- Genus: Atrocalopteryx
- Species: A. coomani

Binomial name
- Atrocalopteryx coomani (Fraser, 1935)

Synonyms
- Calopteryx coomani

Species of damselfly

Atrocalopteryx coomani is a species of broad-winged damselfly in the family Calopterygidae.

The IUCN conservation status of Atrocalopteryx coomani is "NT", near threatened. The species may be considered threatened in the near future. The IUCN status was reviewed in 2010.
