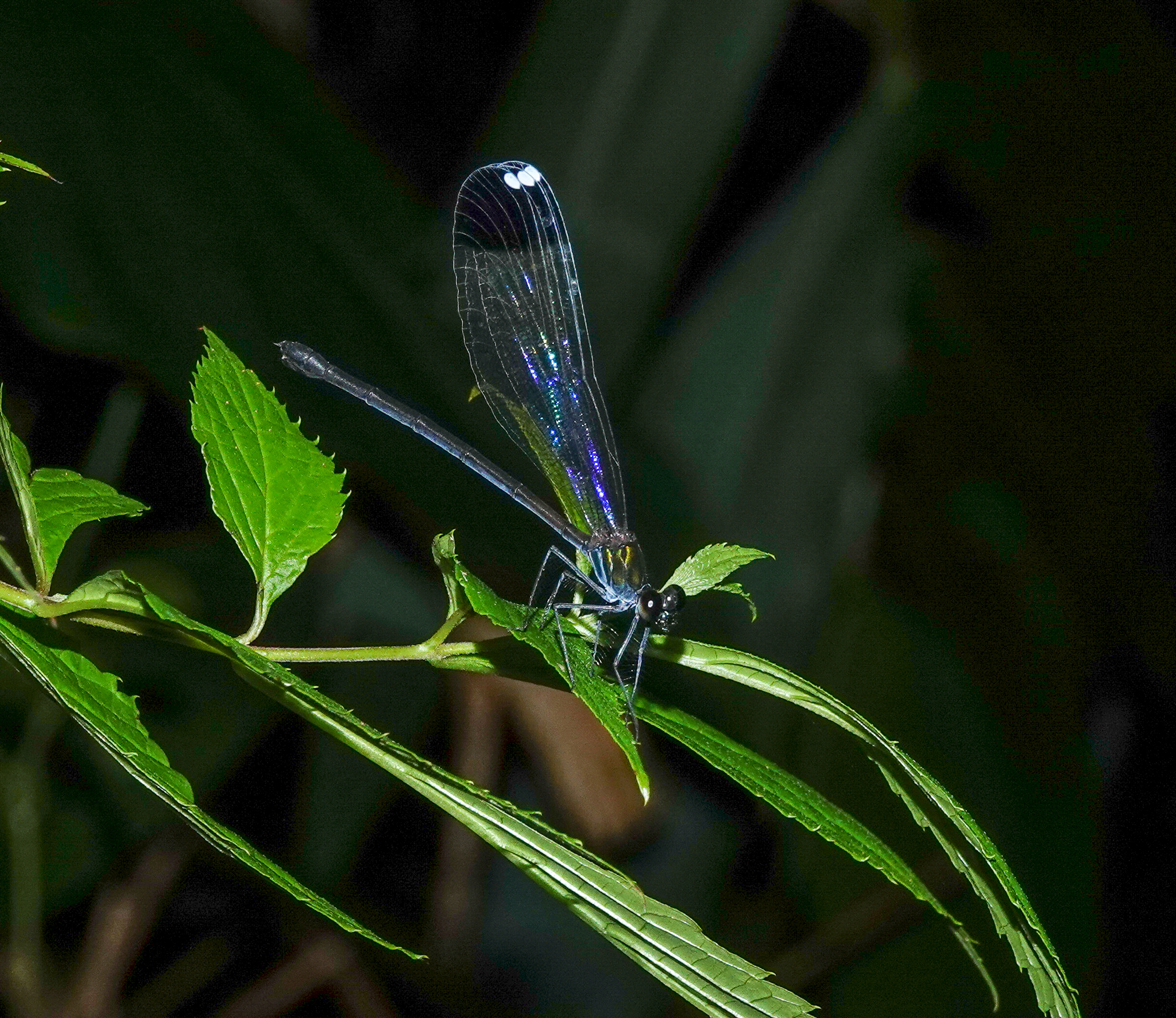
- An Echo margarita from Arunachal, India

Conservation status
- Least Concern (IUCN 3.1)

Scientific classification
- Kingdom: Animalia
- Phylum: Arthropoda
- Class: Insecta
- Order: Odonata
- Suborder: Zygoptera
- Family: Calopterygidae
- Genus: Echo
- Species: E. margarita

Binomial name
- Echo margarita Selys, 1853

= Echo margarita =

Species of damselfly

Echo margarita is a species of broad-winged damselfly in the family Calopterygidae.

The IUCN conservation status of Echo margarita is "LC", least concern, with no immediate threat to the species' survival. The IUCN status was reviewed in 2010.

== Subspecies ==
These two subspecies belong to the species Echo margarita:

- Echo margarita margarita
- Echo margarita tripartita Selys, 1879
