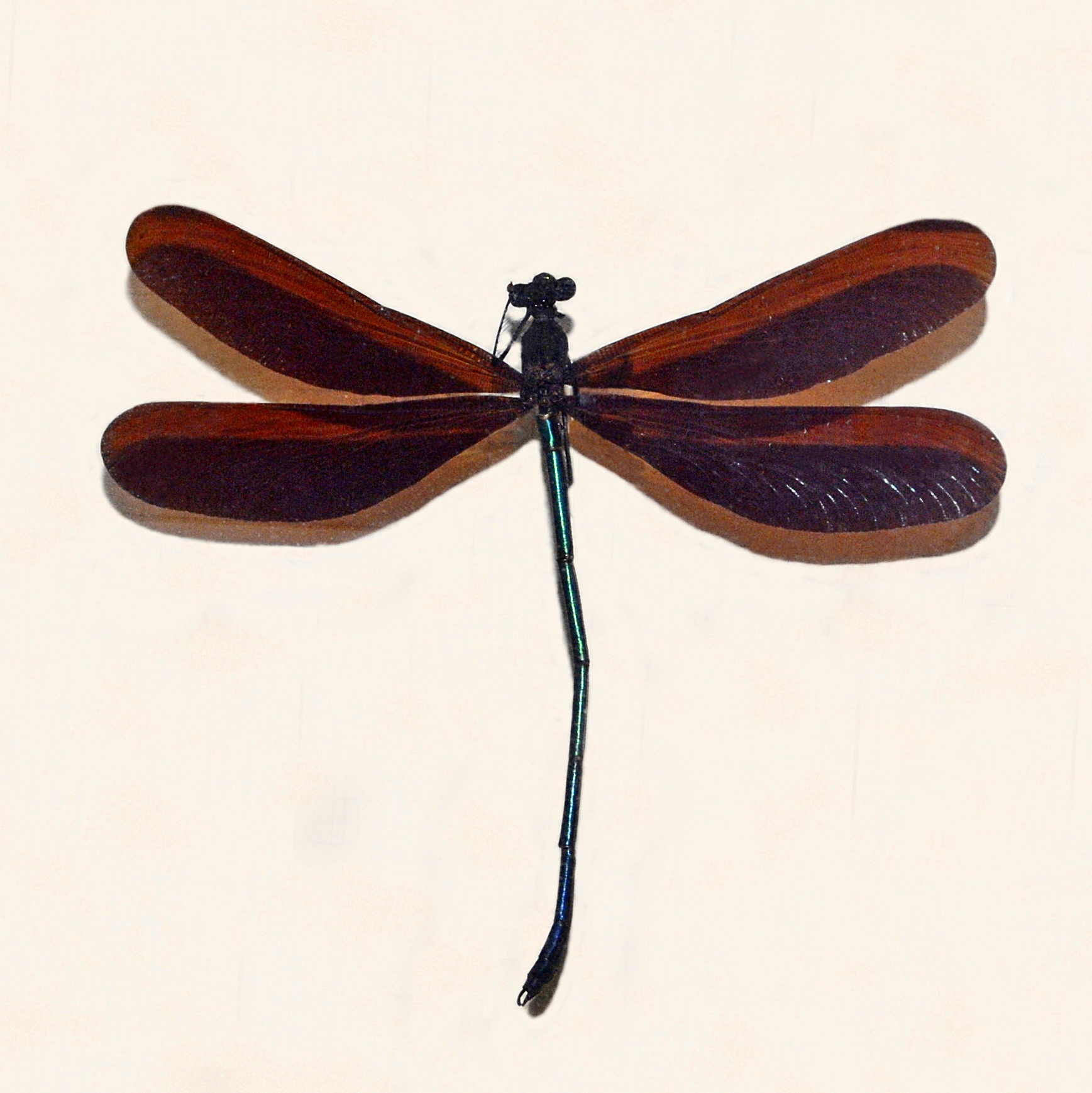
- Male from Japan

Conservation status
- Least Concern (IUCN 3.1)

Scientific classification
- Domain: Eukaryota
- Kingdom: Animalia
- Phylum: Arthropoda
- Class: Insecta
- Order: Odonata
- Suborder: Zygoptera
- Family: Calopterygidae
- Genus: Atrocalopteryx
- Species: A. atrata

Binomial name
- Atrocalopteryx atrata (Selys, 1853)

Synonyms
- Calopteryx atrata Selys, 1853; Calopteryx grandaeva Selys, 1853; Calopteryx smaragdina Selys, 1853; Vestalis tristis Navás, 1932

= Atrocalopteryx atrata =

Species of damselfly

Atrocalopteryx atrata is a species of damselfly belonging to the family Calopterygidae. It is native to Asia, where it is widespread in China, Korea, and Japan.

This species lives near rivers and streams in flatland habitat, open forests, and sometimes urban areas.
