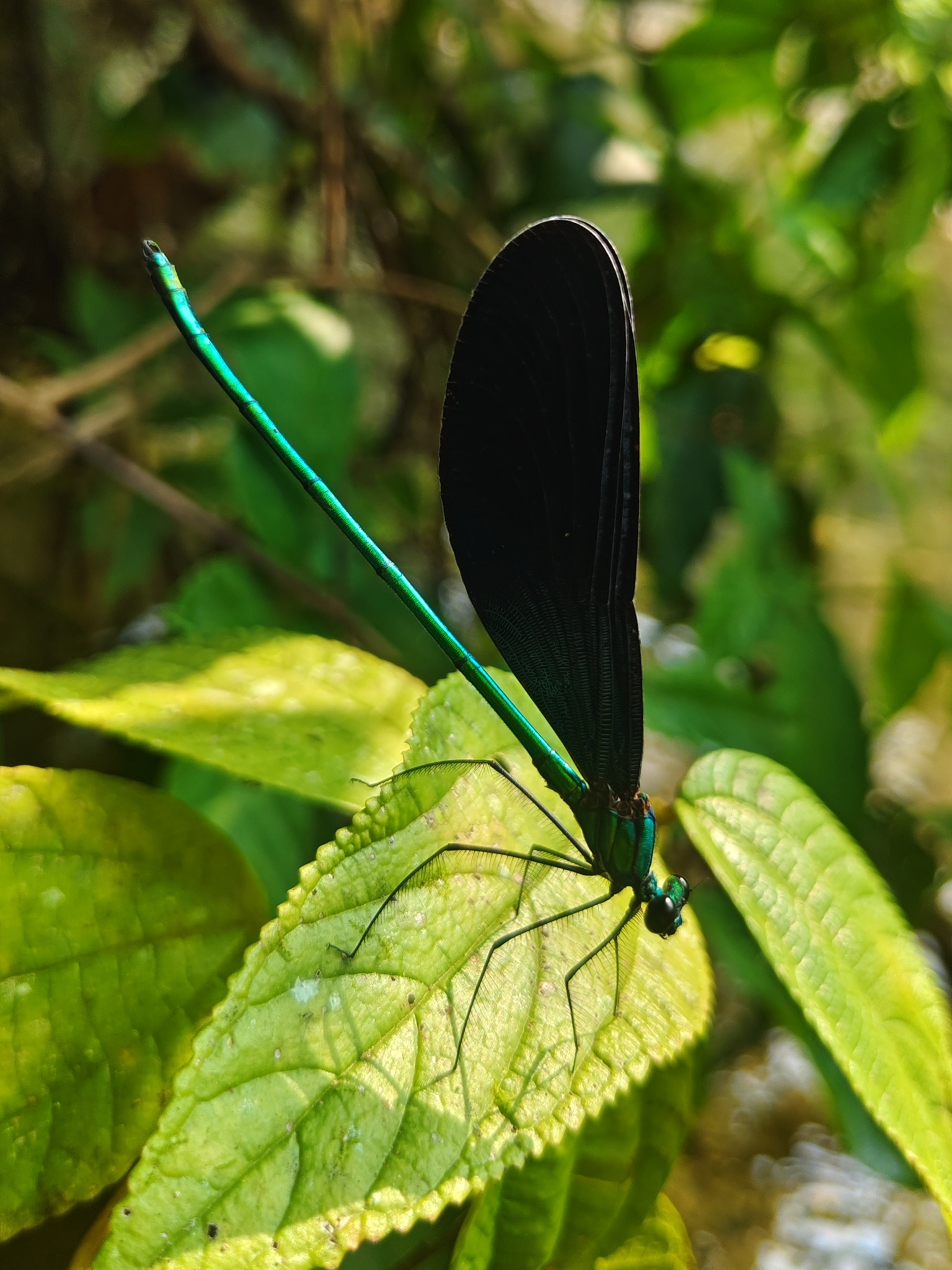

Conservation status
- Least Concern (IUCN 3.1)

Scientific classification
- Domain: Eukaryota
- Kingdom: Animalia
- Phylum: Arthropoda
- Class: Insecta
- Order: Odonata
- Suborder: Zygoptera
- Family: Calopterygidae
- Genus: Matrona
- Species: M. basilaris

Binomial name
- Matrona basilaris Selys, 1853

= Matrona basilaris =

Species of damselfly

Matrona basilaris is a species of broad-winged damselfly found in East Asia.

== Description ==
Matrona basilaris is a large damselfly which ranges in color from brilliant metallic green in males to reddish brown in females. Its wings range in color from dark blue to reddish brown.

== Distribution ==
Matrona basilaris and its subspecies have been found in China, Japan, Northern Vietnam, and Eastern Laos. It is generally found at modest altitudes of approximately 900m around mountain streams or rivers with dense surrounding vegetation.
