= M. pudica =

M. pudica may refer to:

- Maxillaria pudica, an orchid species in the genus Maxillaria
- Mimosa pudica, a herb species
- Mnesarete pudica, a damselfly species in the genus Mnesarete

== See also ==
- Pudica
