= Caliphaea sinuofurcata =

Scientific classification
- Kingdom: Animalia
- Phylum: Arthropoda
- Clade: Pancrustacea
- Class: Insecta
- Order: Odonata
- Suborder: Zygoptera
- Family: Calopterygidae
- Genus: Caliphaea
- Species: C. sinuofurcata

Binomial name
- Caliphaea sinuofurcata Sawant, Joshi & Kunte, 2025

Species of damselfly

Caliphaea sinuofurcata is a species of damselfly found in Arunchal Pradesh in India. It was found in the Siang Valley and Hunli in the lower Dibang valleys in Arunachal. The paraproct shape and genitalia helps to differentiate it from the other species of damselflies in the Caliphaea genus.

== Etymology ==
The species was named by joining the latin words of sinus referring to its curved paraproct and furcata referring to its split tail appendages.
