= Echo modesta =

Conservation status
- Least Concern (IUCN 3.1)

Scientific classification
- Kingdom: Animalia
- Phylum: Arthropoda
- Class: Insecta
- Order: Odonata
- Suborder: Zygoptera
- Family: Calopterygidae
- Genus: Echo
- Species: E. modesta

Binomial name
- Echo modesta Laidlaw, 1902

Species of damselfly

Echo modesta is a species of broad-winged damselfly in the family Calopterygidae.

The IUCN conservation status of Echo modesta is "LC", least concern, with no immediate threat to the species' survival. The population is stable. The IUCN status was reviewed in 2011.
