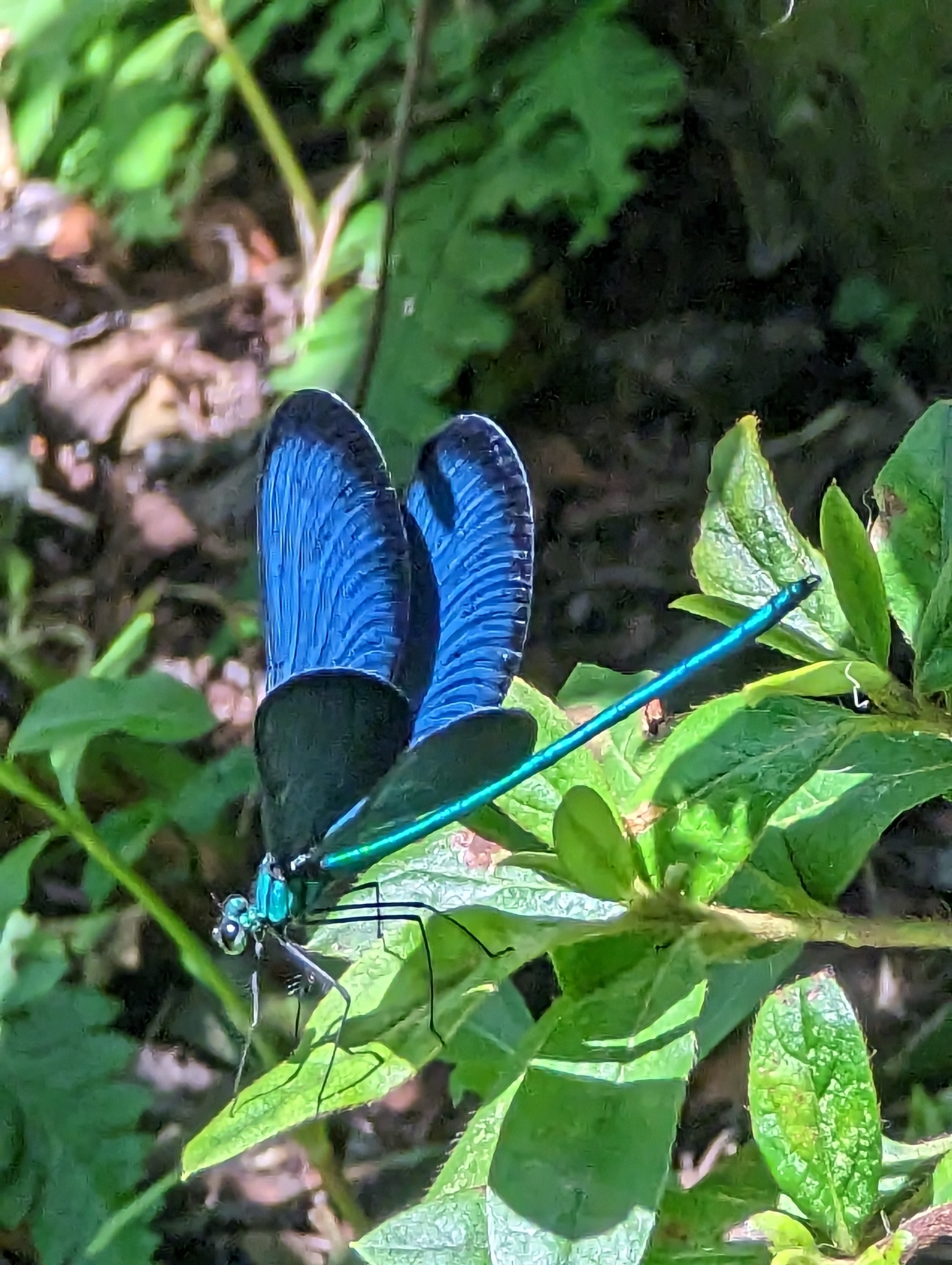
- A male Matrona cyanoptera

Scientific classification
- Domain: Eukaryota
- Kingdom: Animalia
- Phylum: Arthropoda
- Class: Insecta
- Order: Odonata
- Suborder: Zygoptera
- Family: Calopterygidae
- Genus: Matrona
- Species: M. cyanoptera

Binomial name
- Matrona cyanoptera (Hämäläinen & Yeh, 2000)

= Matrona cyanoptera =

Species of damselfly

Matrona cyanoptera is a species of damselfly found in Taiwan. The common name for the species is Formosan jewelwing.

== Description and habitat ==
Males have a green thorax and abdomen with a metallic blue sheen. Their wings are metallic blue. At the end of their tail, males have a double-pronged clasper for holding onto the female when mating.

Females have a metallic green thorax and a green or dull brown abdomen. Their wings may be dark brown and have a white pseudopterostigma. Juvenile males may also have brown wings.

Adults of the species have a total body length 62-67mm.

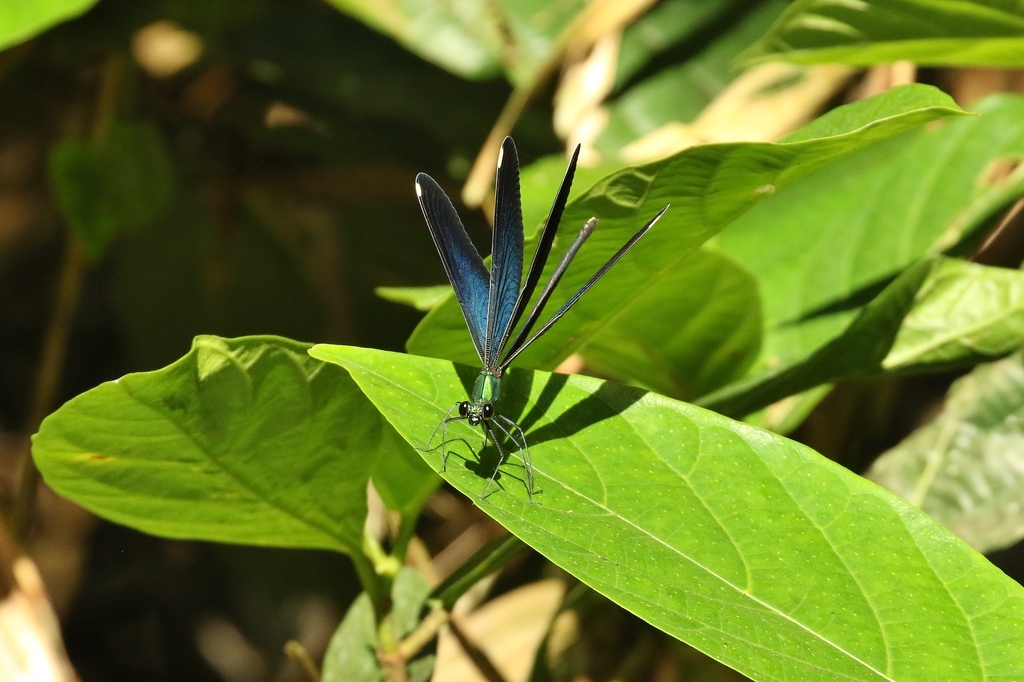
A female Matrona cyanoptera

This species is generally found around shallow streams or lakes in low-altitude mountainous regions. It can typically be seen perching on the tips of leaves or flying over the water

== Courtship and mating ==
In order to secure mates from competition, males will rest on waterside plants and attempt to chase off any rival males that enter the area. When courting a female, the male will display its wings and tail-end clasper. After mating, the male will guard the female while she lays her eggs and continue to make courtship displays with his wings.

Females typically lay their eggs on the underside of aquatic plants.
