= Iridictyon myersi =

Conservation status
- Least Concern (IUCN 3.1)

Scientific classification
- Kingdom: Animalia
- Phylum: Arthropoda
- Class: Insecta
- Order: Odonata
- Suborder: Zygoptera
- Family: Calopterygidae
- Genus: Iridictyon
- Species: I. myersi

Binomial name
- Iridictyon myersi Needham & Fisher, 1940

Species of damselfly

Iridictyon myersi is a species of broad-winged damselfly in the family Calopterygidae. It is found only on the tepuis of Venezuela and Guyana at elevations of 1,000–2,400 m (3,300–7,900 ft) above sea level.

Iridictyon myersi has a restricted range and is only known from a few locations. However, the range is within the Canaima National Park and there are no threats to its habitat.
