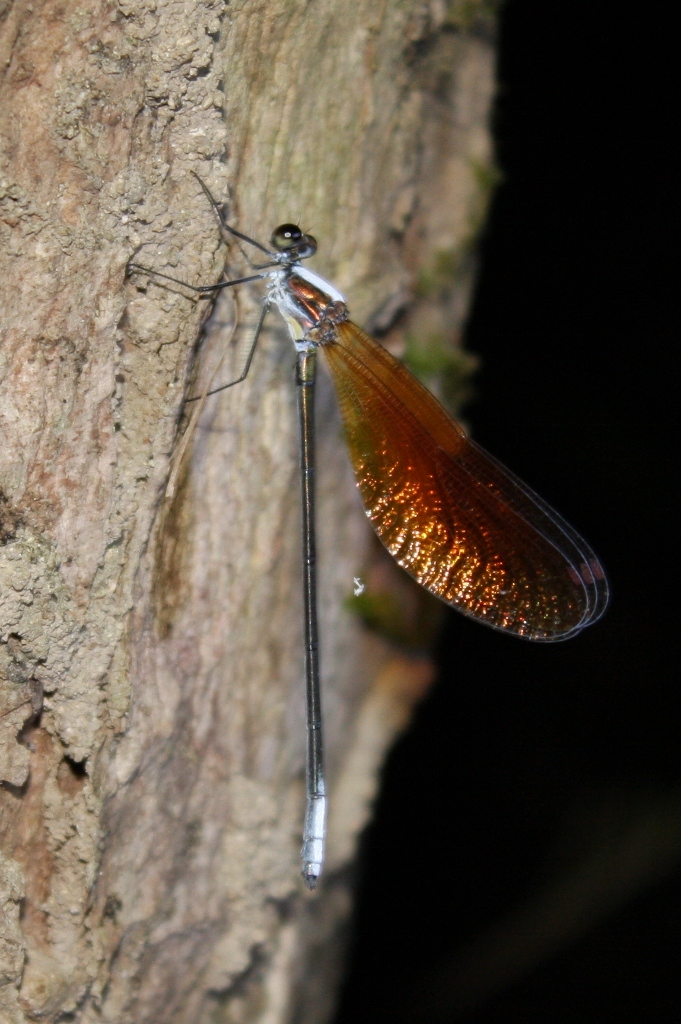
- Mnais mneme

Scientific classification
- Kingdom: Animalia
- Phylum: Arthropoda
- Class: Insecta
- Order: Odonata
- Suborder: Zygoptera
- Family: Calopterygidae
- Subfamily: Calopteryginae
- Tribe: Mnaisini
- Genus: Mnais; Selys, 1853

= Mnais =

Genus of damselflies

Mnais is a genus of broad-winged damselflies, known as copperwings, in the family Calopterygidae. The genus was described by the Belgian entomologist Edmond de Sélys Longchamps in 1853. There are 15 described species in Mnais.

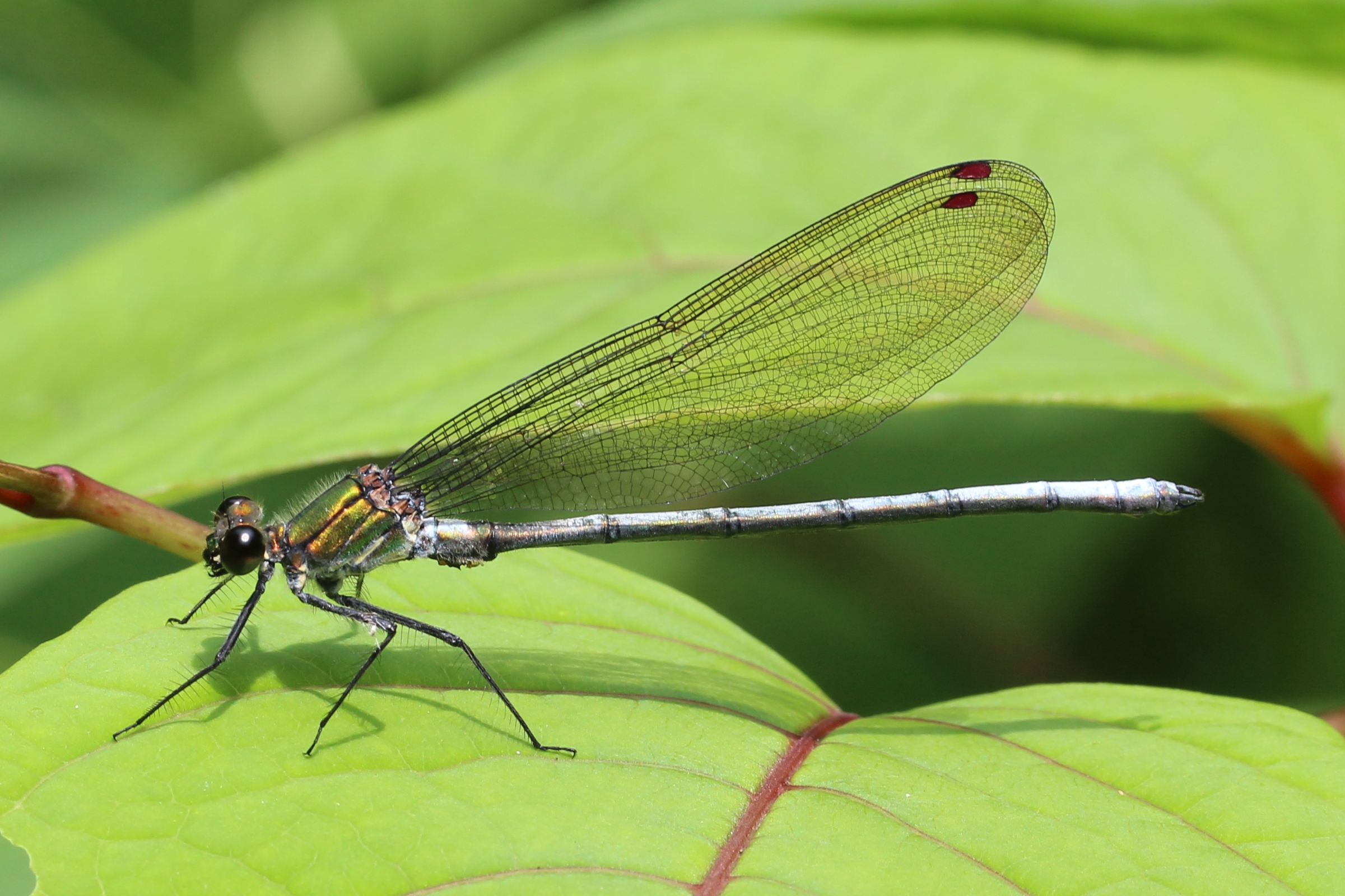
Mnais pruinosa

== Distribution ==
Mnias damselflies are found primarily in eastern Asia.

== Biology and Behaviour ==
Adult male Mnais occur in two genetically determined wing morphs, orange-winged and clear-winged, controlled by a single locus. Orange-winged males tend to be territorial and defend oviposition sites, while clear-winged males are typically non-territorial and perch nearby to intercept females.

== Species ==
These 15 species belong to the genus Mnais:

- Mnais andersoni McLachlan in Selys, 1873
- Mnais auripennis Needham, 1930
- Mnais costalis Selys, 1869
- Mnais decolorata Bartenef, 1913
- Mnais esakii Asahina, 1976
- Mnais gregoryi Fraser, 1924
- Mnais icteroptera Fraser, 1929
- Mnais incolor Martin, 1921
- Mnais maclachlani Fraser, 1924
- Mnais mneme Ris, 1916
- Mnais pieli Navas, 1936
- Mnais pruinosa Selys, 1853
- Mnais semiopaca May, 1935
- Mnais tenuis Oguma, 1913
- Mnais yunosukei (Asahina, 1990)
