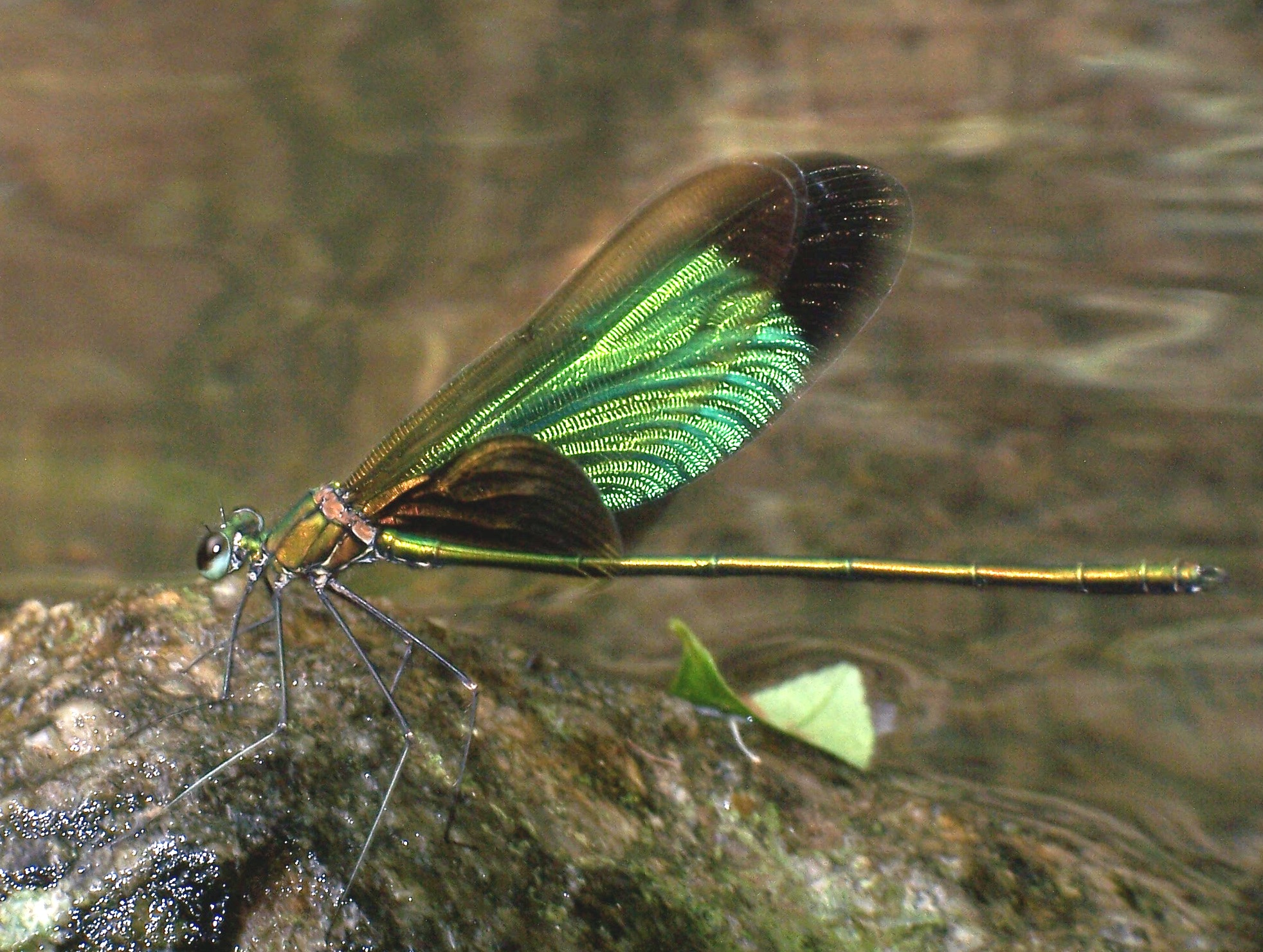
- Neurobasis chinensis

Scientific classification
- Kingdom: Animalia
- Phylum: Arthropoda
- Clade: Pancrustacea
- Class: Insecta
- Order: Odonata
- Suborder: Zygoptera
- Family: Calopterygidae
- Subfamily: Calopteryginae
- Tribe: Calopterygini
- Genus: Neurobasis; Selys, 1853

= Neurobasis =

Genus of damselflies

Neurobasis is a genus of damselflies belonging to the family Calopterygidae. They are found from India, through south-east Asia, Indonesia and New Guinea.

== Species ==
The genus contains the following species:

Image	Name	Distribution
	Neurobasis anderssoni Sjöstedt, 1926	China (Fujian, Guangxi, Sichuan and Zhejiang).
	Neurobasis anumariae Hämäläinen, 1989	Philippines
	Neurobasis australis Selys, 1878 - Papuan Demoiselle	New Guinea and Indonesia
	Neurobasis awamena Michalski, 2006	New Guinea
	Neurobasis chinensis (Linnaeus, 1758)	Asia
	Neurobasis daviesi Hämäläinen, 1993	Philippines (Palawan)
	Neurobasis florida Hagen in Walker, 1853	Java
	Neurobasis ianthinipennis Lieftinck, 1949	Indonesia, Papua
	Neurobasis kaupi Brauer, 1867	Sulawesi
	Neurobasis kimminsi Lieftinck, 1955	Papua New Guinea
	Neurobasis longipes Hagen, 1887	Sarawak, Malaysia (Borneo)
	Neurobasis luzoniensis Selys, 1879	Philippines
	Neurobasis subpicta Hämäläinen, 1990	Philippines
