= Iridictyon =

Scientific classification
- Kingdom: Animalia
- Phylum: Arthropoda
- Clade: Pancrustacea
- Class: Insecta
- Order: Odonata
- Suborder: Zygoptera
- Family: Calopterygidae
- Subfamily: Calopteryginae
- Tribe: Iridictyonini; Dumont et al., 2005
- Genus: Iridictyon; Needham & Fisher, 1940

Genus of damselflies

Iridictyon is a small genus of damselflies in the family Calopterygidae. It contains only two species, both known only from Guyana and Venezuela:

- Iridictyon myersi Needham & Fisher, 1940 – Tepui shinywing
- Iridictyon trebbaui Rácenis, 1968 – White-banded shinywing
