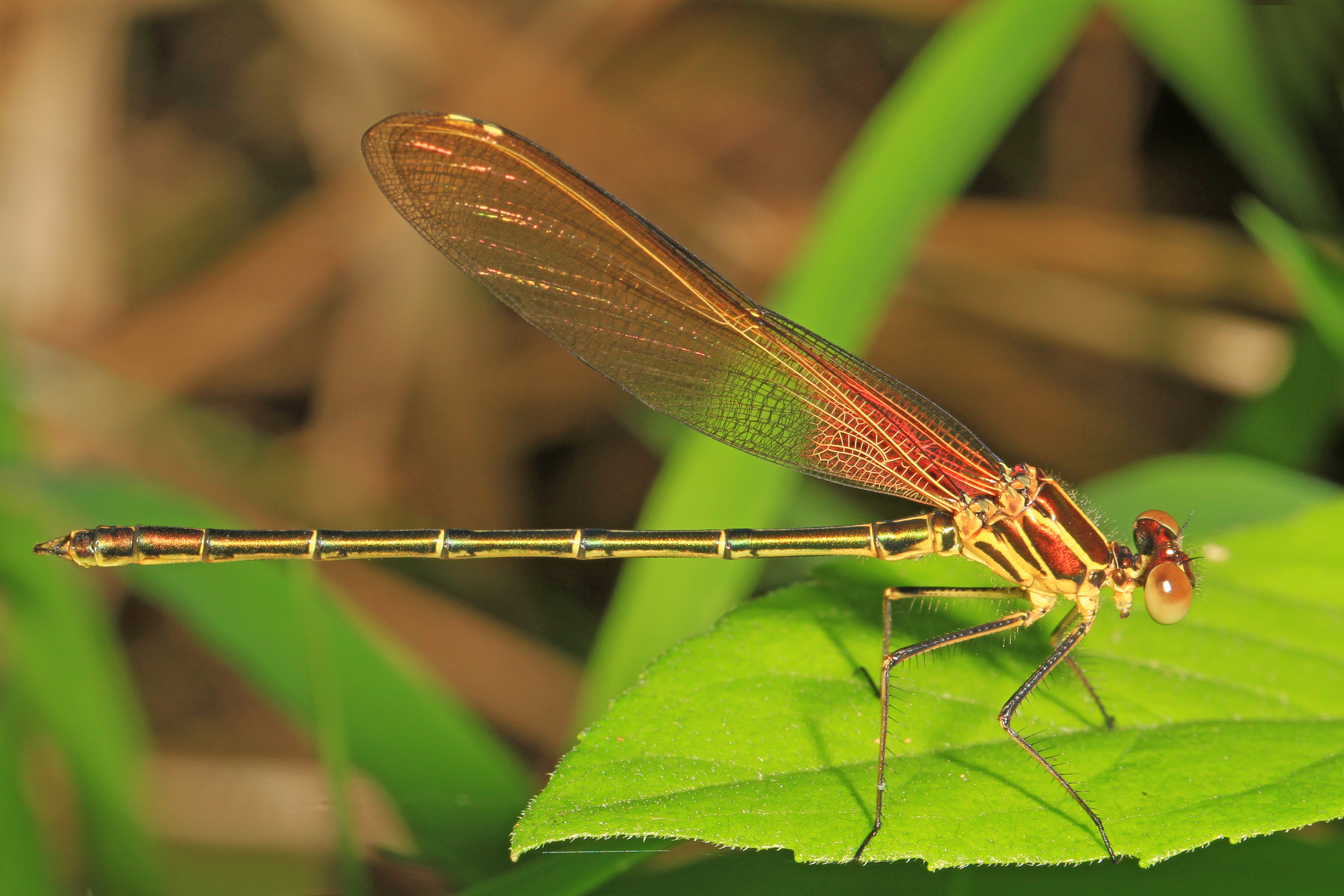
- Hetaerina americana, American Rubyspot, Virginia

Scientific classification
- Kingdom: Animalia
- Phylum: Arthropoda
- Clade: Pancrustacea
- Class: Insecta
- Order: Odonata
- Suborder: Zygoptera
- Family: Calopterygidae
- Subfamily: Hetaerininae; Tillyard & Fraser, 1939

= Hetaerininae =

Subfamily of damselflies

Hetaerininae is a subfamily of broad-winged damselflies in the family Calopterygidae. There are at least 4 genera and more than 70 described species in Hetaerininae.

== Genera ==
These four genera belong to the subfamily Hetaerininae:

- Bryoplathanon Garrison, 2006
- Hetaerina Hagen, 1853 (rubyspots)
- Mnesarete Cowley, 1934
- Ormenophlebia Garrison, 2006
