= Caliphaea =

Scientific classification
- Kingdom: Animalia
- Phylum: Arthropoda
- Class: Insecta
- Order: Odonata
- Suborder: Zygoptera
- Family: Calopterygidae
- Subfamily: Calopteryginae
- Tribe: Caliphaeini; Fraser, 1929
- Genus: Caliphaea; Hagen, 1859

Genus of damselflies

Caliphaea is a genus of broad-winged damselflies in the family Calopterygidae. There are about seven described species in Caliphaea.

== Species ==
These five species belong to the genus Caliphaea:

- Caliphaea angka Hämäläinen, 2003
- Caliphaea confusa Hagen in Selys, 1859
- Caliphaea consimilis McLachlan, 1894
- Caliphaea hermannkunzi Zhang & Hämäläinen, 2020
- Caliphaea nitens Navás, 1934
- Caliphaea thailandica Asahina, 1976
- Caliphaea sinuofurcata Sawant, Joshi & Kunte, 2025
