= Noguchiphaea =

Scientific classification
- Kingdom: Animalia
- Phylum: Arthropoda
- Class: Insecta
- Order: Odonata
- Suborder: Zygoptera
- Family: Calopterygidae
- Subfamily: Calopteryginae
- Tribe: Noguchiphaeini; Dumont et al., 2005
- Genus: Noguchiphaea; Asahina, 1976

Genus of damselflies

Noguchiphaea is a genus of broad-winged damselflies in the family Calopterygidae. There are at least three described species in Noguchiphaea.

== Species ==
These three species belong to the genus Noguchiphaea:

- Noguchiphaea laotica Sasamoto, Yokoi & Souphanthong, 2019
- Noguchiphaea mattii Do, 2008
- Noguchiphaea yoshikoae Asahina, 1976
