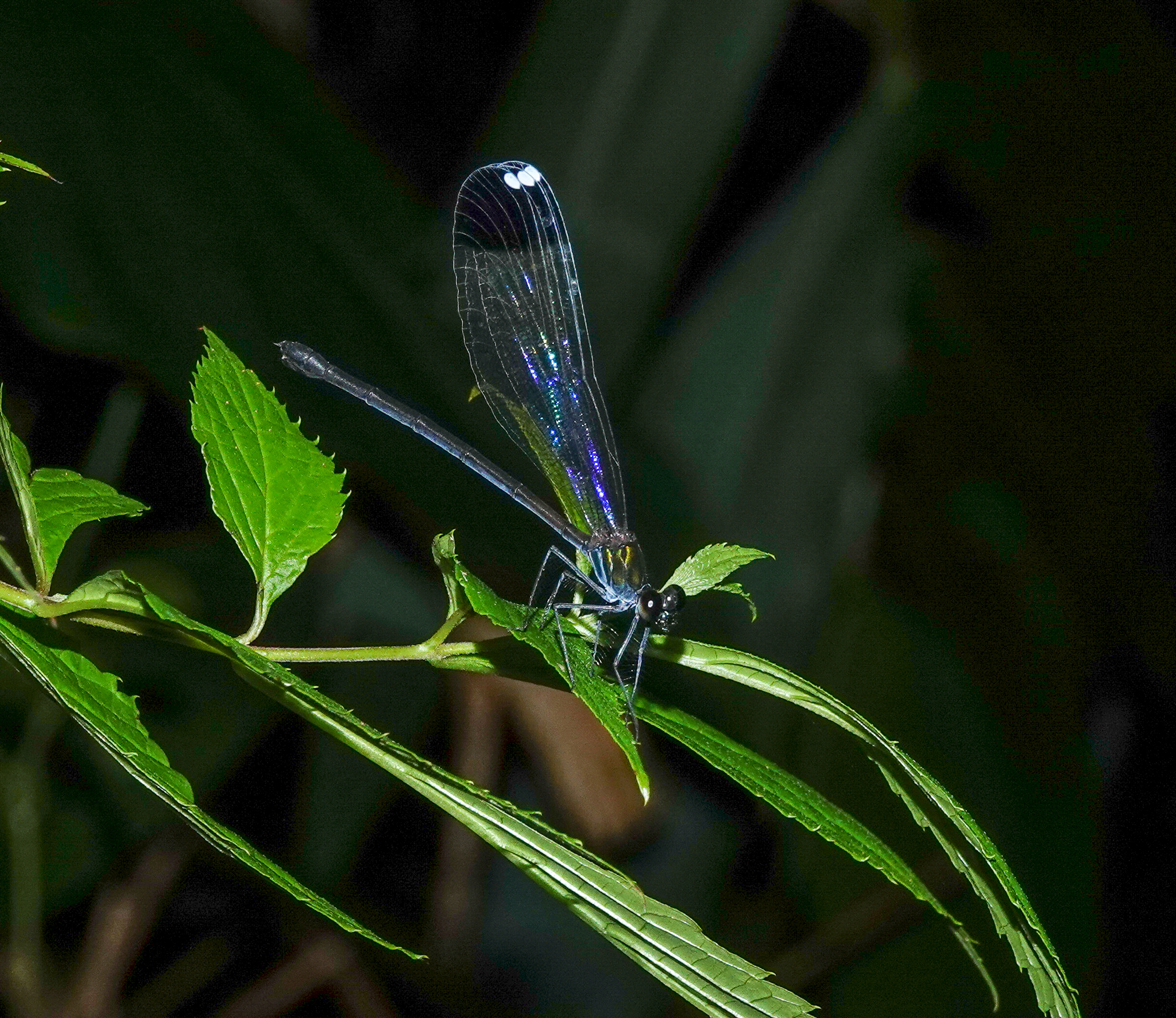
- Echo margarita

Scientific classification
- Kingdom: Animalia
- Phylum: Arthropoda
- Class: Insecta
- Order: Odonata
- Suborder: Zygoptera
- Family: Calopterygidae
- Subfamily: Calopteryginae
- Tribe: Mnaisini
- Genus: Echo; Selys, 1853

= Echo (damselfly) =

Genus of damselflies

Echo is a genus of damselflies belonging to the family Calopterygidae. There are five species. A sixth, Echo maxima, is sometimes included, but it likely belongs to a different genus.

This genus is distributed in Asia, especially Southeast Asia.

Species include:

- Echo candens Zhang, Hämäläinen, & Cai, 2015
- Echo margarita Selys, 1853
- Echo modesta Laidlaw, 1902
- Echo perornata Yu & Hämäläinen, 2012
- Echo uniformis Selys, 1879
