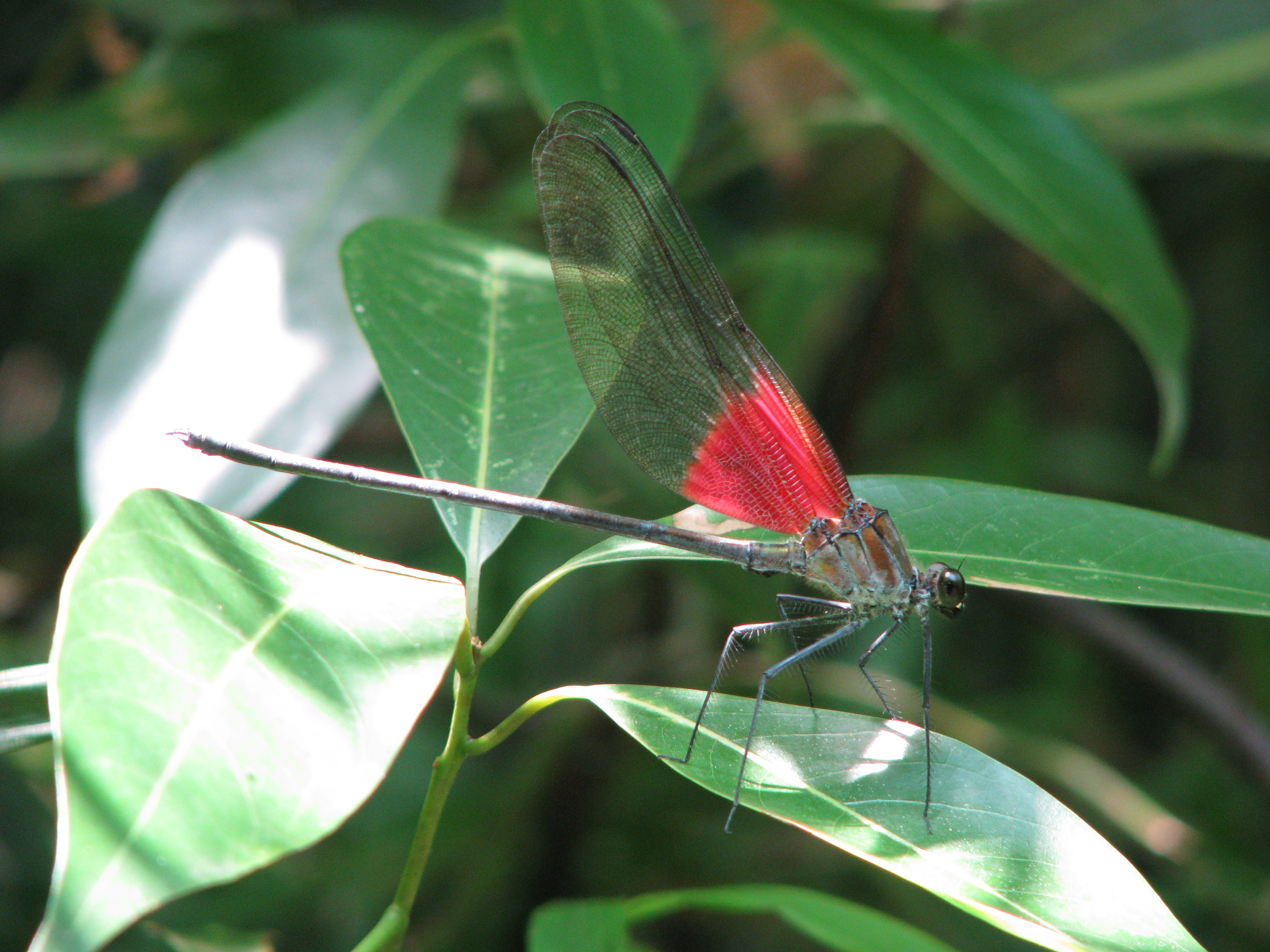
- Archineura incarnata

Scientific classification
- Kingdom: Animalia
- Phylum: Arthropoda
- Class: Insecta
- Order: Odonata
- Suborder: Zygoptera
- Family: Calopterygidae
- Subfamily: Calopteryginae
- Tribe: Mnaisini
- Genus: Archineura; Kirby, 1894

= Archineura =

Genus of damselflies

Archineura is a genus of broad-winged damselflies in the family Calopterygidae. There are at least three described species in Archineura.

== Species ==
These three species belong to the genus Archineura:

- Archineura hetaerinoides (Fraser, 1933)
- Archineura incarnata (Karsch, 1891)
- Archineura maxima (Martin, 1904)
