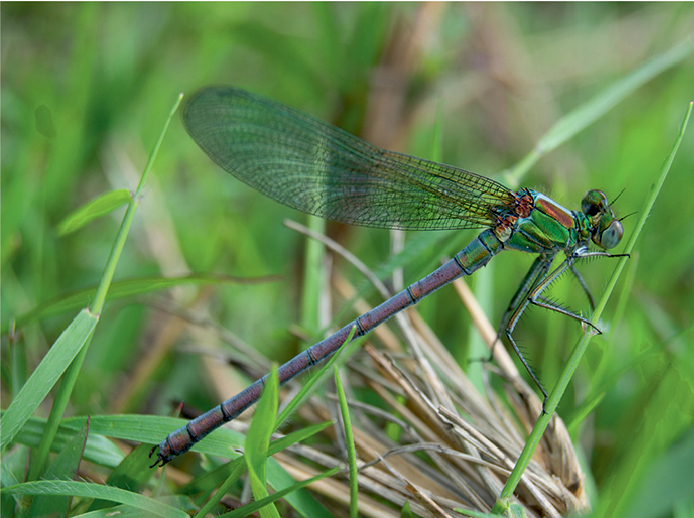
- Umma femina

Scientific classification
- Kingdom: Animalia
- Phylum: Arthropoda
- Clade: Pancrustacea
- Class: Insecta
- Order: Odonata
- Suborder: Zygoptera
- Family: Calopterygidae
- Subfamily: Calopteryginae
- Tribe: Saphoini
- Genus: Umma; Kirby, 1890

Type species
- Umma cincta Selys, 1853

= Umma (damselfly) =

Genus of damselflies

Umma is a genus of damselflies belonging to the family Calopterygidae.

Species include:

- Umma cincta (Hagen in Selys, 1853) – Broad-winged Sparklewing
- Umma declivium Förster, 1906 – Green-banded Sparklewing
- Umma electa Longfield, 1933 – Metallic Sparklewing
- Umma femina Longfield, 1947 – Angola Sparklewing
- Umma gumma Dijkstra, Mézière & Kipping, 2015
- Umma infumosa Fraser, 1951 (syn. Sapho infumosa)
- Umma longistigma (Selys, 1869) – Bare-bellied Sparklewing
- Umma mesostigma (Selys, 1879) – Hairy-bellied Sparklewing
- Umma mesumbei Vick, 1996 – Cameroon Sparklewing
- Umma purpurea Pinhey, 1961 – Purple Sparklewing
- Umma saphirina Förster, 1916 – Sapphire Sparklewing
