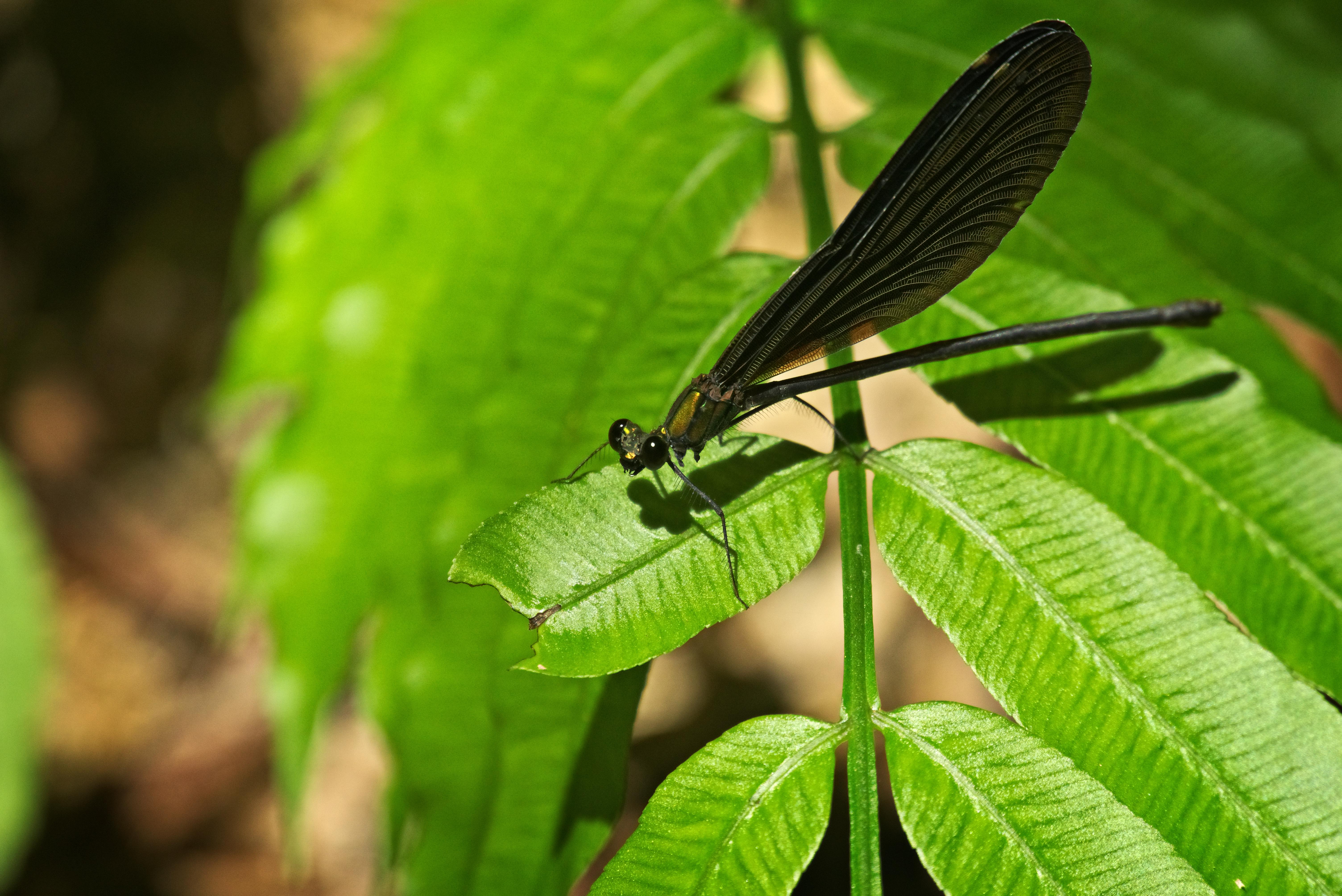
- Atrocalopteryx atrata

Scientific classification
- Kingdom: Animalia
- Phylum: Arthropoda
- Class: Insecta
- Order: Odonata
- Suborder: Zygoptera
- Family: Calopterygidae
- Subfamily: Calopteryginae
- Tribe: Calopterygini
- Genus: Atrocalopteryx; Dumont, Vanfleteren, De Jonckheere & Weekers, 2005

= Atrocalopteryx =

Genus of damselflies

Atrocalopteryx is a genus of damselflies belonging to the family Calopterygidae. It was established in 2005 during a phylogenetic study of the family, and its definition is still unclear.

== Species ==
Species include:

- Atrocalopteryx atrata (Selys, 1853)
- Atrocalopteryx atrocyana (Fraser, 1935)
- Atrocalopteryx auco Hämäläinen, 2014
- Atrocalopteryx coomani (Fraser, 1935)
- Atrocalopteryx fasciata Yang, Hämäläinen & Zhang, 2014
- Atrocalopteryx laosica (Fraser, 1933)
- Atrocalopteryx melli (Ris, 1912)
- Atrocalopteryx oberthueri (McLachlan, 1894)
