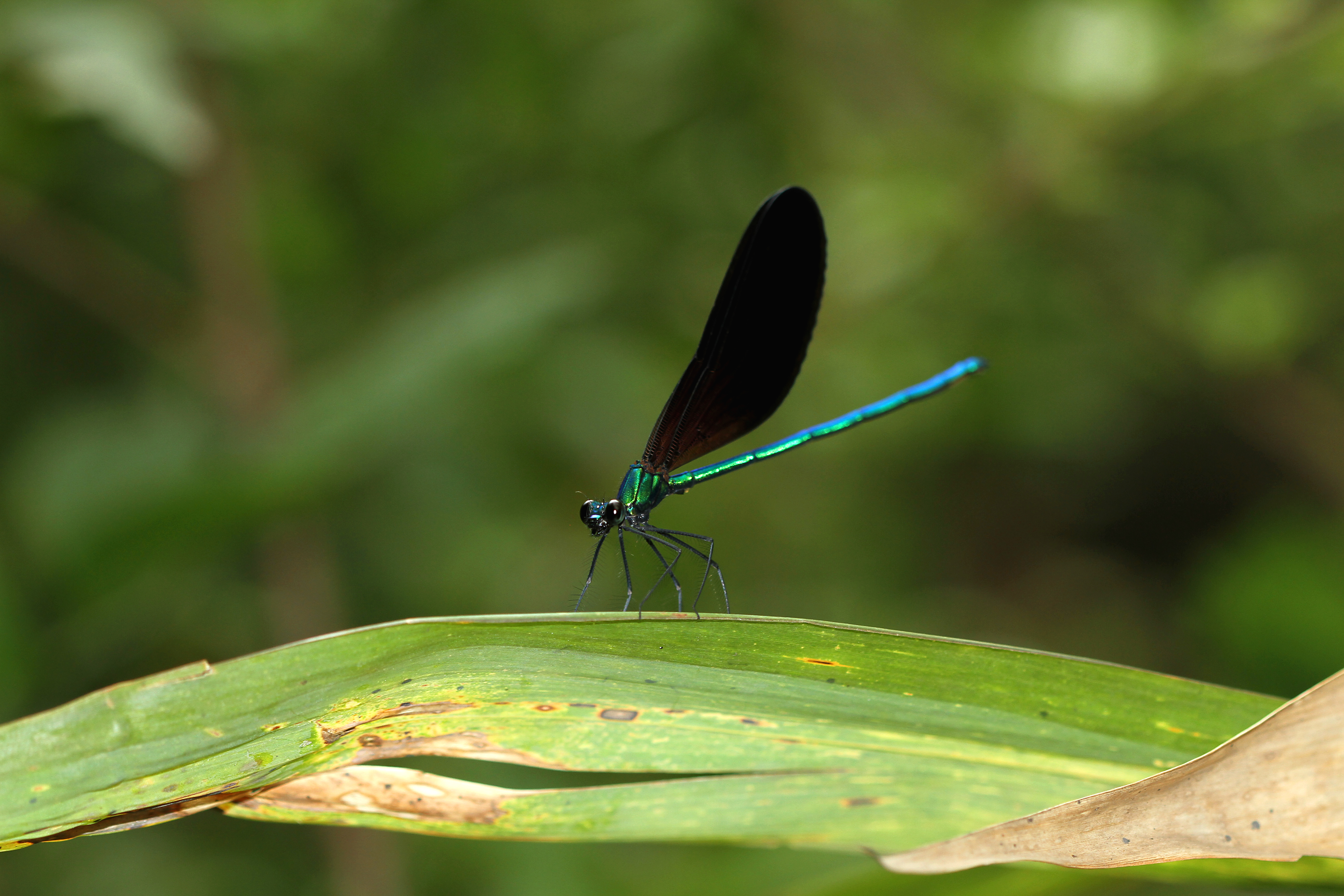
- Matrona basilaris from India

Scientific classification
- Kingdom: Animalia
- Phylum: Arthropoda
- Class: Insecta
- Order: Odonata
- Suborder: Zygoptera
- Family: Calopterygidae
- Subfamily: Calopteryginae
- Tribe: Calopterygini
- Genus: Matrona; Sélys, 1853

Species
- 9 See text for species

= Matrona (damselfly) =

Genus of damselflies

Matrona is a genus of damselflies in the family Calopterygidae.

Species include:

- Matrona basilaris
- Matrona corephaea
- Matrona cyanoptera
- Matrona japonica
- Matrona mazu
- Matrona nigripectus
- Matrona oberthueri
- Matrona oreades
- Matrona taoi
