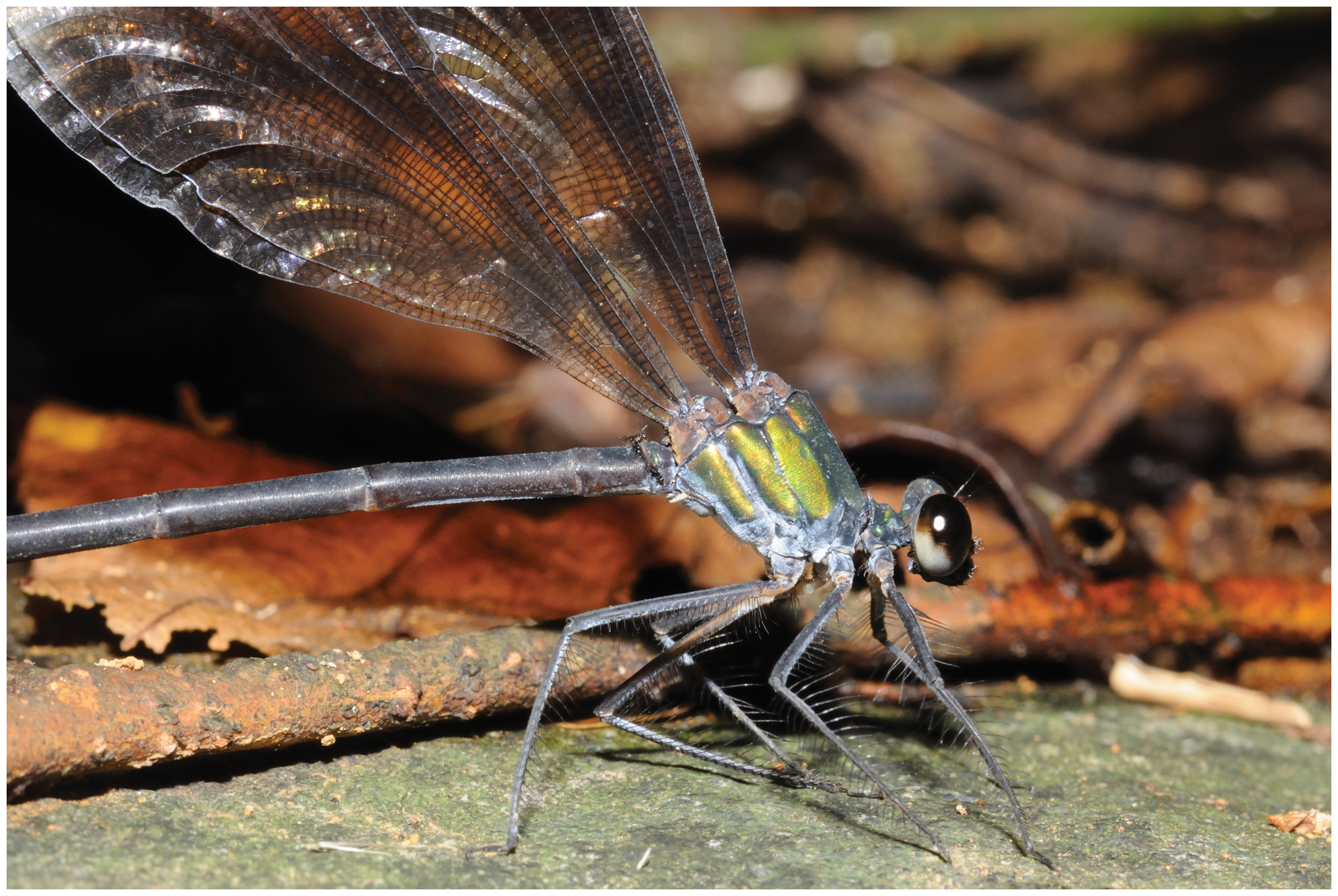
- Psolodesmus mandarinus

Scientific classification
- Kingdom: Animalia
- Phylum: Arthropoda
- Class: Insecta
- Order: Odonata
- Suborder: Zygoptera
- Family: Calopterygidae
- Subfamily: Calopteryginae
- Tribe: Mnaisini
- Genus: Psolodesmus; McLachlan, 1870

= Psolodesmus =

Genus of damselflies

Psolodesmus is a genus of broad-winged damselflies in the family Calopterygidae. There are at least two described species in Psolodesmus.

== Species ==
These two species belong to the genus Psolodesmus:

- Psolodesmus kuroiwae Oguma, 1913
- Psolodesmus mandarinus McLachlan, 1870
