= Mnesarete =

- Mnesarete pruinosa resting on a leaf

Scientific classification
- Kingdom: Animalia
- Phylum: Arthropoda
- Clade: Pancrustacea
- Class: Insecta
- Order: Odonata
- Suborder: Zygoptera
- Family: Calopterygidae
- Subfamily: Hetaerininae
- Genus: Mnesarete; Cowley, 1934

Genus of damselflies

Mnesarete is a genus of damselflies in the family Calopterygidae.

There are about 27 species. All are limited to South America.

Species include:

- Mnesarete aenea (Selys, 1853)
- Mnesarete astrape De Marmels, 1989
- Mnesarete borchgravii (Selys, 1869)
- Mnesarete cupraea (Selys, 1853)
- Mnesarete devillei (Selys, 1880)
- Mnesarete drepane Garrison, 2006
- Mnesarete ephippium Garrison, 2006
- Mnesarete fulgida (Selys, 1879)
- Mnesarete fuscibasis (Calvert, 1909)
- Mnesarete grisea (Ris, 1918)
- Mnesarete guttifera (Selys, 1873)
- Mnesarete hauxwelli (Selys, 1869)
- Mnesarete hyalina (Hagen in Selys, 1853)
- Mnesarete lencionii Garrison, 2006
- Mnesarete loutoni Garrison, 2006
- Mnesarete machadoi Garrison, 2006
- Mnesarete marginata (Selys, 1879)
- Mnesarete mariana Machado, 1996
- Mnesarete metallica (Selys, 1869)
- Mnesarete pruinosa (Hagen in Selys, 1853)
- Mnesarete pudica (Hagen in Selys, 1853)
- Mnesarete rhopalon Garrison, 2006
- Mnesarete smaragdina (Selys, 1869)
- Mnesarete williamsoni Garrison, 2006
