= Sapho (damselfly) =

Scientific classification
- Kingdom: Animalia
- Phylum: Arthropoda
- Class: Insecta
- Order: Odonata
- Suborder: Zygoptera
- Family: Calopterygidae
- Subfamily: Calopteryginae
- Tribe: Saphoini
- Genus: Sapho; Selys, 1853

Genus of insects

Sapho is a genus of damselfly in the family Calopterygidae.
