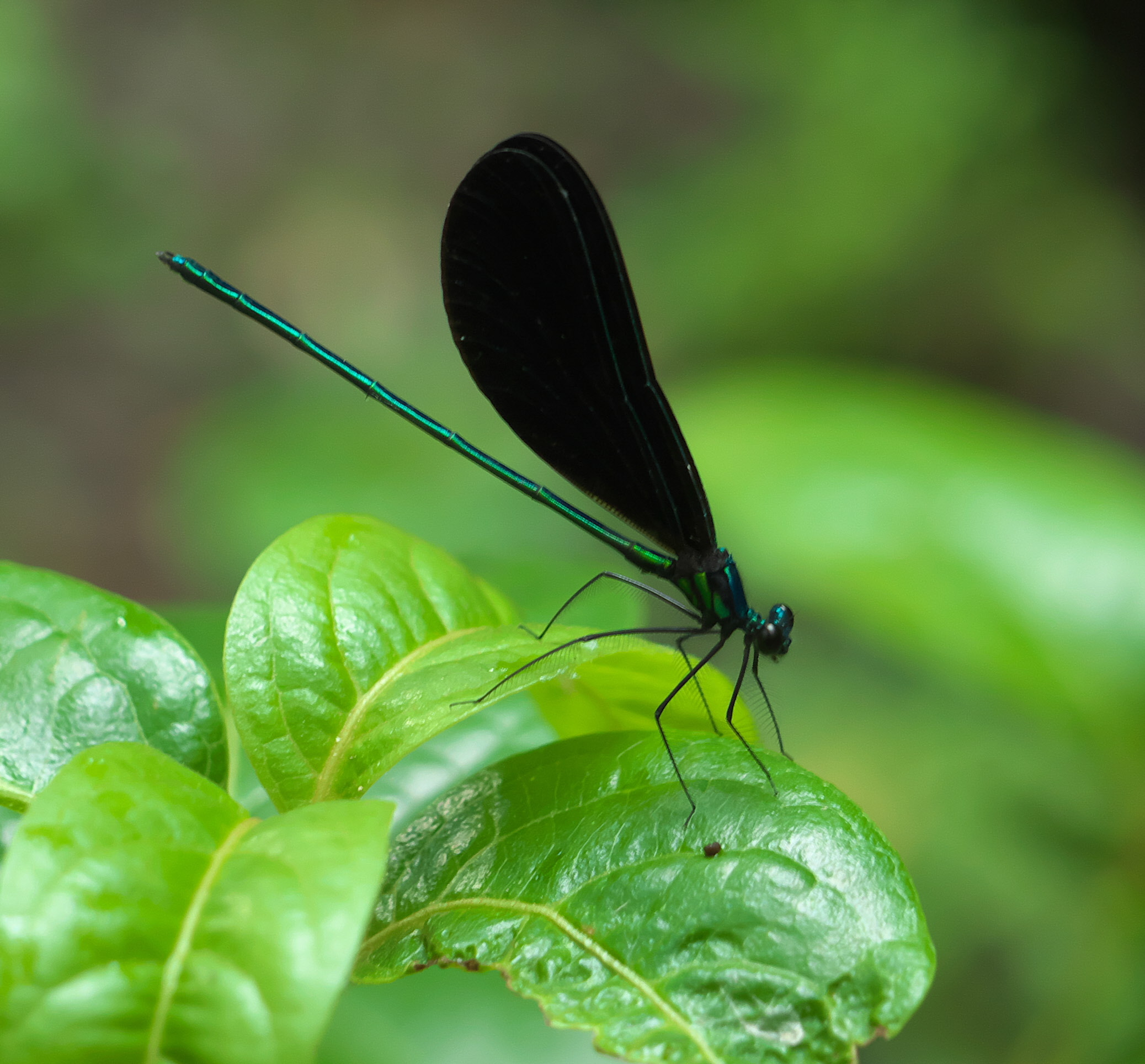
- Calopteryx maculata

Scientific classification
- Kingdom: Animalia
- Phylum: Arthropoda
- Clade: Pancrustacea
- Class: Insecta
- Order: Odonata
- Suborder: Zygoptera
- Family: Calopterygidae
- Subfamily: Calopteryginae; Selys, 1850

Tribes
- Caliphaeini Fraser, 1929; Calopterygini Selys, 1850; Iridictyonini Dumont et al., 2005; Mnaisini Ishida, 1996; Noguchiphaeini Dumont et al., 2005; Saphoini Dumont et al., 2005; Vestalini Needham, 1903

= Calopteryginae =

Subfamily of damselflies

Calopteryginae is a subfamily of broad-winged damselflies in the family Calopterygidae. There are about 17 genera and more than 160 described species in Calopteryginae.

== Genera ==
These 17 genera belong to the subfamily Calopteryginae:

- Archineura Kirby, 1894
- Atrocalopteryx Dumont et al., 2005
- Caliphaea Hagen, 1859
- Calopteryx Leach, 1815 (jewelwings)
- Echo Selys, 1853
- Iridictyon Needham & Fisher, 1940
- Matrona Selys, 1853
- Matronoides Foerster, 1897
- Mnais Selys, 1853
- Neurobasis Selys, 1853
- Noguchiphaea Asahina, 1976
- Phaon Selys, 1853
- Psolodesmus McLachlan, 1870
- Sapho Selys, 1853
- Umma Kirby, 1890
- Vestalaria May, 1935
- Vestalis Selys, 1853
