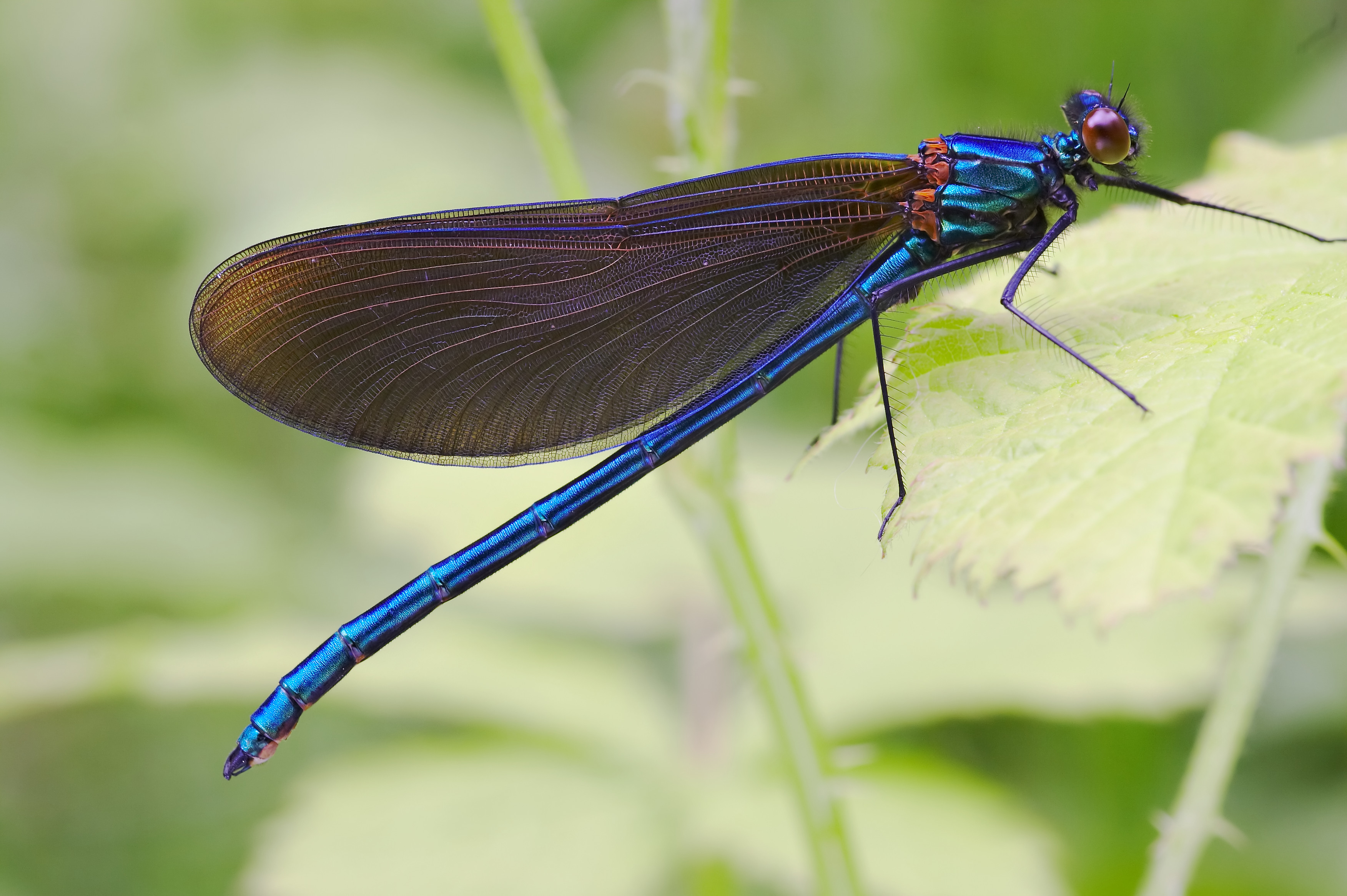
- Immature adult male Calopteryx virgo
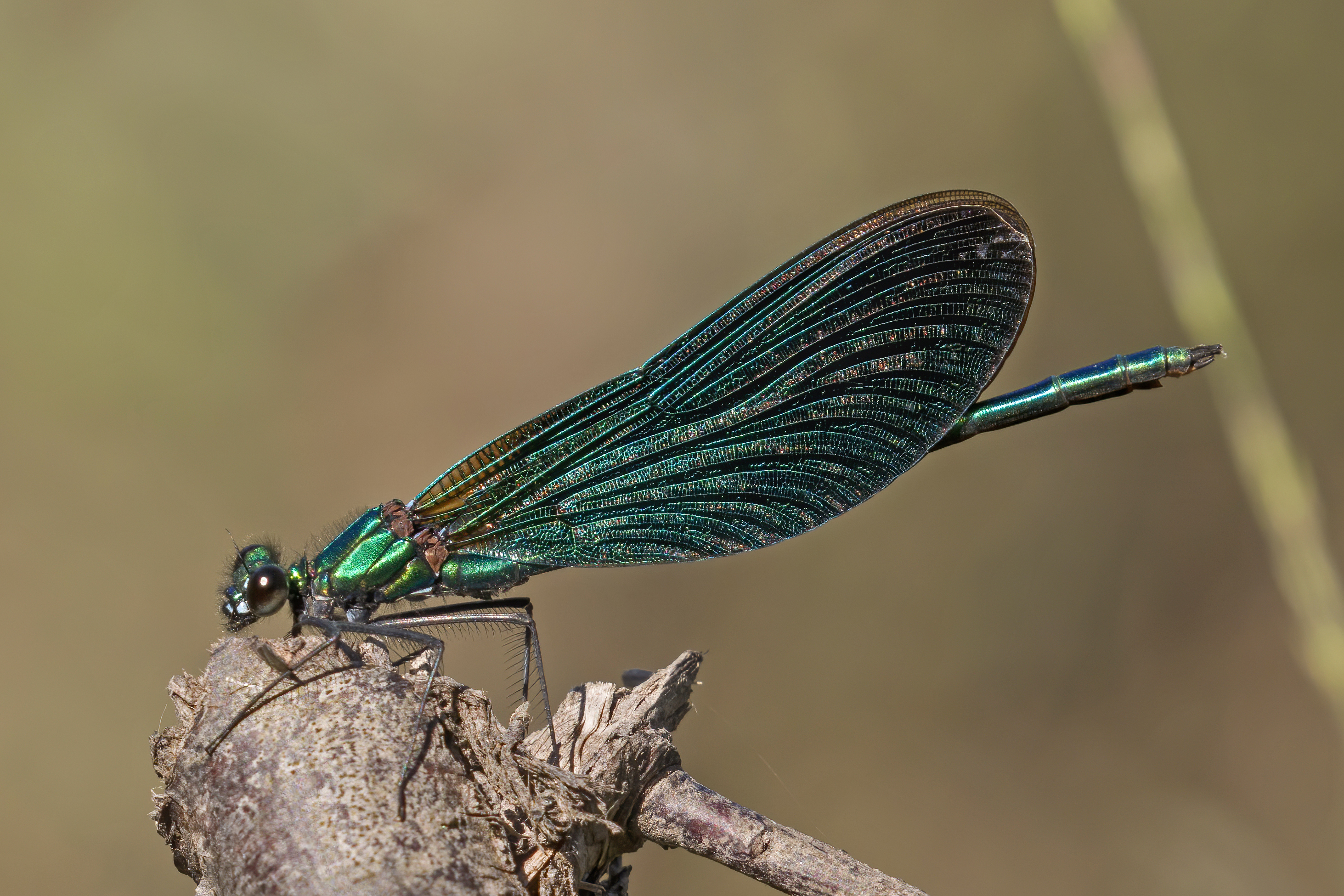
- Adult male Calopteryx virgo

Scientific classification
- Kingdom: Animalia
- Phylum: Arthropoda
- Clade: Pancrustacea
- Class: Insecta
- Order: Odonata
- Suborder: Zygoptera
- Superfamily: Calopterygoidea
- Family: Calopterygidae; Selys, 1850

Subfamilies
- Calopteryginae; Hetaerininae; See text for genera
- Distribution of Calopterygidae

= Calopterygidae =

Family of damselflies

Calopterygidae is a family of damselflies, in the superfamily Calopterygoidea. Members of Calopterygidae are commonly known as broad-winged damselflies, demoiselles, or jewelwings. These rather large damselflies have wingspans of 50–80 mm (compared to about 44 mm in the common bluetail damselfly, Ischnura elegans), are often metallic-coloured, and can be differentiated from other damselflies by the broader connection between the wings and the body, as opposed to the abrupt narrowing seen in other damselfly families. The family contains some 150 species.

The Calopterygidae are found on every continent except Antarctica. They live along rivers and streams.

== Characteristics ==
The adults have metallic bodies; their wings are broader, with wider bases than other damselflies, and at rest hold their wings parallel to the body, slightly elevated. Some species have conspicuously colored wings; in males, the wings are usually blue, without pterostigmata, in females green or brown. Species are often quite variable in color and patterning, and they are sexually dimorphic. Color intensity may fade with age. The wings are heavily veined, having often 18 or more antenodal veins. The first segment of their antennae is longer than the combined length of the other segments. They have a jerky, skipping form of flight similar to the flight pattern of a butterfly (fluttering, rather than hovering stably like many other damselfly and dragonfly families). At least one species of Calopterygidae has shown morphological plasticity in wing length associated with the closeness of a forest to the river or stream where it lives, with a more distant forest correlating to greater wing length. Calopterygids perch horizontally on twigs near the water's edge.

Calopterygidae nymphs have lateral gills are longer than the median gills. The nymphs have a flattened, pentagonal-shaped head, a long first antennal segment and long legs. They are found among submerged aquatic plants, woody debris and the exposed roots of streamside plants. There is a single generation per year. The time spent in the larval stage is influenced by both biotic factors, such as fat reserves, and abiotic factors, such as temperature, so they have the highest chances of surviving and reproducing.

== Behavior ==
Hetaerina americana mating: sperm removal

The mating system of most species in this family is resource defense polygyny, where males are often territorial, guarding riverine habitat that is sought after by females for egg deposition. Some males are not territorial. Within a species there may be a territorial and nonterritorial morph, which may be different in coloration.

Some species display courtship behavior, especially displays of wing movement by the male. At least one genus (Hetaerina) displays lekking behavior.

During mating, the male first removes other males' sperm from the female's reproductive tract, then places his own sperm there. The intromittent organ of the male has spines that physically remove rival sperm and also stimulate the female's muscles to contract and expel the sperm. In many species, the male accompanies the female when she searches for a site to lay eggs; in some cases, he even remains attached to her. The guarding of females post-copulation is done so another male does not mate with the female before laying her eggs even though the male may be able to reproduce with other females and in the case of Hetaerina species, the male may lose his territory during the time spent guarding.

Like all Odonata species, the species in this family are carnivorous in both their larval and adult stages. Larvae tend to feed on smaller invertebrates, such as mayflies.

== Taxonomic history ==
Calopterygidae was established by Selys in 1850 for damselflies related to the genus Calopteryx. It is one of the oldest family-group names in Odonata and has remained widely recognised throughout subsequent classifications.

During the twentieth century some authors proposed separating certain lineages from Calopterygidae, most notably the American Hetaerininae as the family Hetaerinidae. However, morphological and molecular studies consistently recovered Calopterygidae as a monophyletic lineage.

Modern classifications therefore retain a broadly defined Calopterygidae, with Hetaerininae treated as the sister group to all remaining members of the family.

== Classification ==
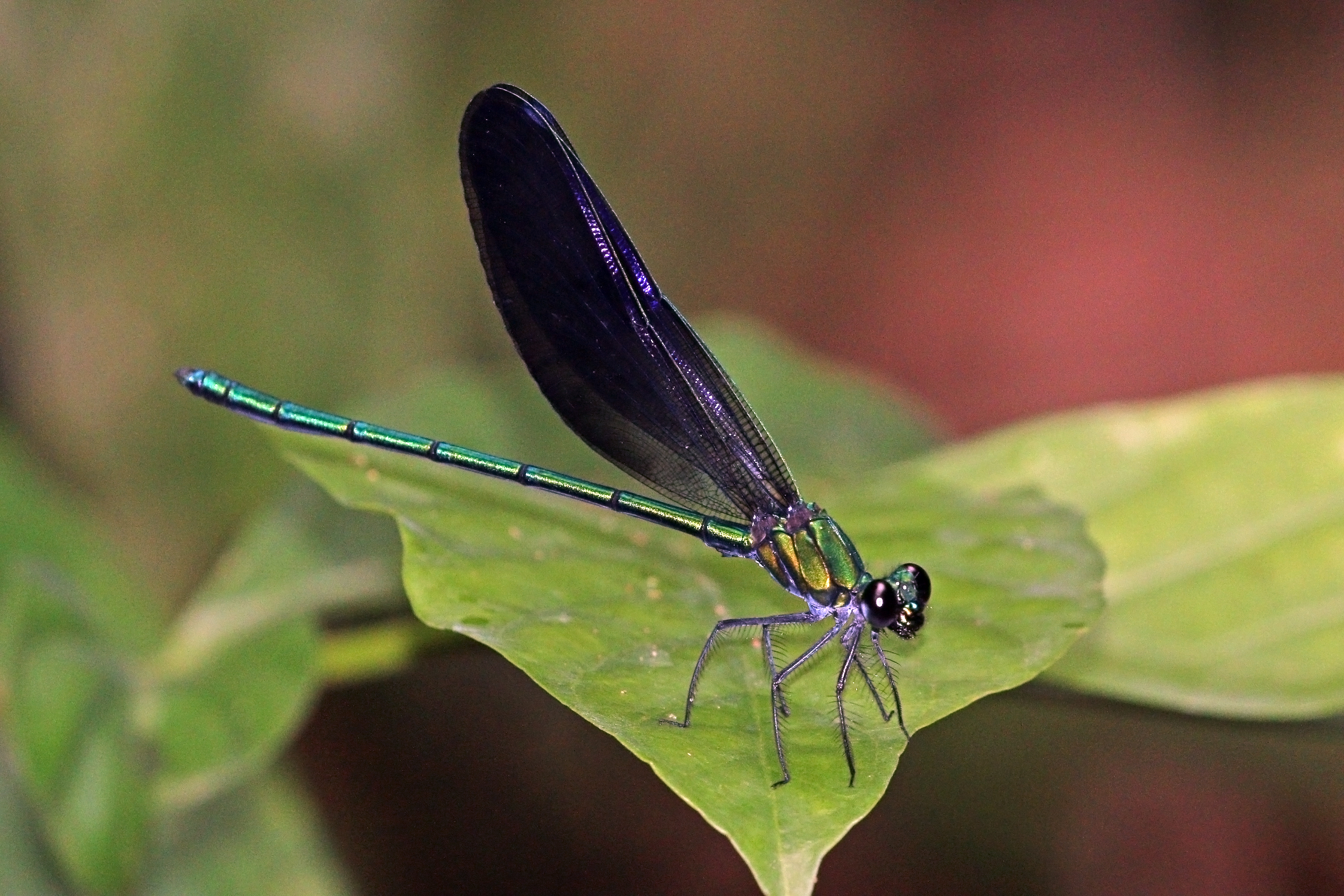
Western bluewing (Sapho ciliata) male, Ghana

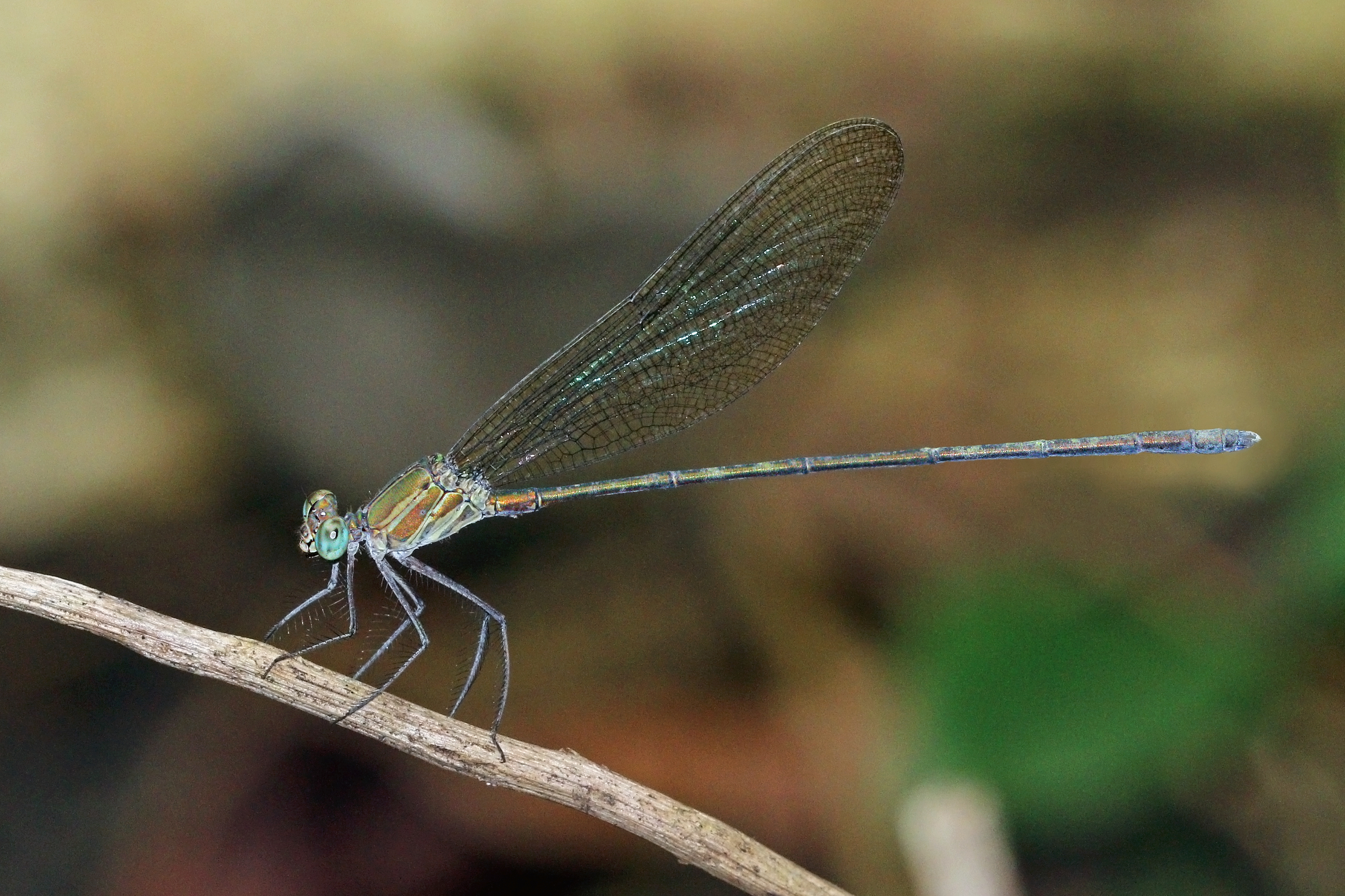
Glistening demoiselle (Phaon iridipennis) male, Ghana

Subfamiles and tribes according to Dijkstra et al. (2014)

Subfamily Calopteryginae Selys, 1859 – the demoiselles:

- Tribe Caliphaeini Fraser, 1929
  - Caliphaea Hagen, 1859
- Tribe Calopterygini Selys, 1850
  - Atrocalopteryx Dumont, Vanfleteren, De Jonckheere, & Weekers, 2005
  - Calopteryx Leach, 1815
  - Matrona Selys, 1853
  - Matronoides Foerster, 1897
  - Neurobasis Selys, 1853
- Tribe Iridictyonini Dumont et al., 2005
  - Iridictyon Needham & Fisher, 1940
- Tribe Mnaisini Ishida, 1996
  - Archineura Kirby, 1894
  - Echo Selys, 1853
  - Mnais Selys, 1853
  - Psolodesmus McLachlan, 1870
- Tribe Noguchiphaeini Dumont et al., 2005
  - Noguchiphaea Asahina, 1976
- Tribe Saphoini Dumont et al., 2005
  - Phaon Selys, 1853
  - Sapho Selys, 1853
  - Umma Kirby, 1890
- Tribe Vestalini Needham, 1903
  - Vestalaria May, 1935
  - Vestalis Selys, 1853

Subfamily Hetaerininae Selys, 1853 – the rubyspots and others:

- Bryoplathanon Garrison, 2006
- Hetaerina Cowley, 1934
- Mnesarete Hagen in Selys, 1853
- Ormenophlebia Garrison, 2006

== Fossil record ==
Fossils attributed to Calopterygidae are known from the Eocene onward, with records from Europe, Asia and North America. Most fossil occurrences are from Oligocene and Miocene deposits in Europe.

=== Fossil genera ===
The following fossil genera are currently placed in Calopterygidae:

- †Guangxicalopteryx Huang et al., 2022
- †Sinocalopteryx Lin et al., 2010

== Etymology ==
The family name Calopterygidae is derived from the type genus Calopteryx, with the standard zoological family suffix -idae.

The genus name Calopteryx is presumably derived from the Greek καλός (kalos, "beautiful") and πτέρυξ (pteryx, "wing"), likely referring to the broad and often brightly coloured wings of these damselflies.
