= Hetair- =

Hetair- or latinicized Hetaer- is a Greek linguistic root bearing the meaning of companion (cf. Latin Socii and societas). It is used in the following terms:

== Ancient Greece ==
- Hetairoi (sing. Hetairos), the name of the Macedonian aristocracy and later Companion cavalry
- Hetaira (plural Hetairai), female sophisticated companions, courtesans
- Hetairideia, a festival of Magnesians and Macedonians
- Hetairiai or Ancient Greek clubs, associations of ancient Greeks who were united by a common interest or goal
- Hetairia or Andreia, the Cretan terms for Doric Syssitia (common meals)
- Hetaireios, an epithet of Zeus

== Modern Greece ==
- Filiki Eteria, a secret 19th century organization whose purpose was to overthrow Ottoman rule over Greece and to establish an independent Greek state
- The Greek term for company, found in many business names such as Jumbo Anonymi Etairia

== Biology ==
- Hetaeria, or hairy jewel orchids, a genus in the family Orchidaceae
- Hetaerina: a genus of damselfly
- Hetaira (katydid): a genus of bush crickets

== Other uses ==
- Hetaireia, a Byzantine imperial guard
- Hetaerism, a theoretical early state of human society that practiced a polyamorous and communistic lifestyle; see Matriarchal religion
