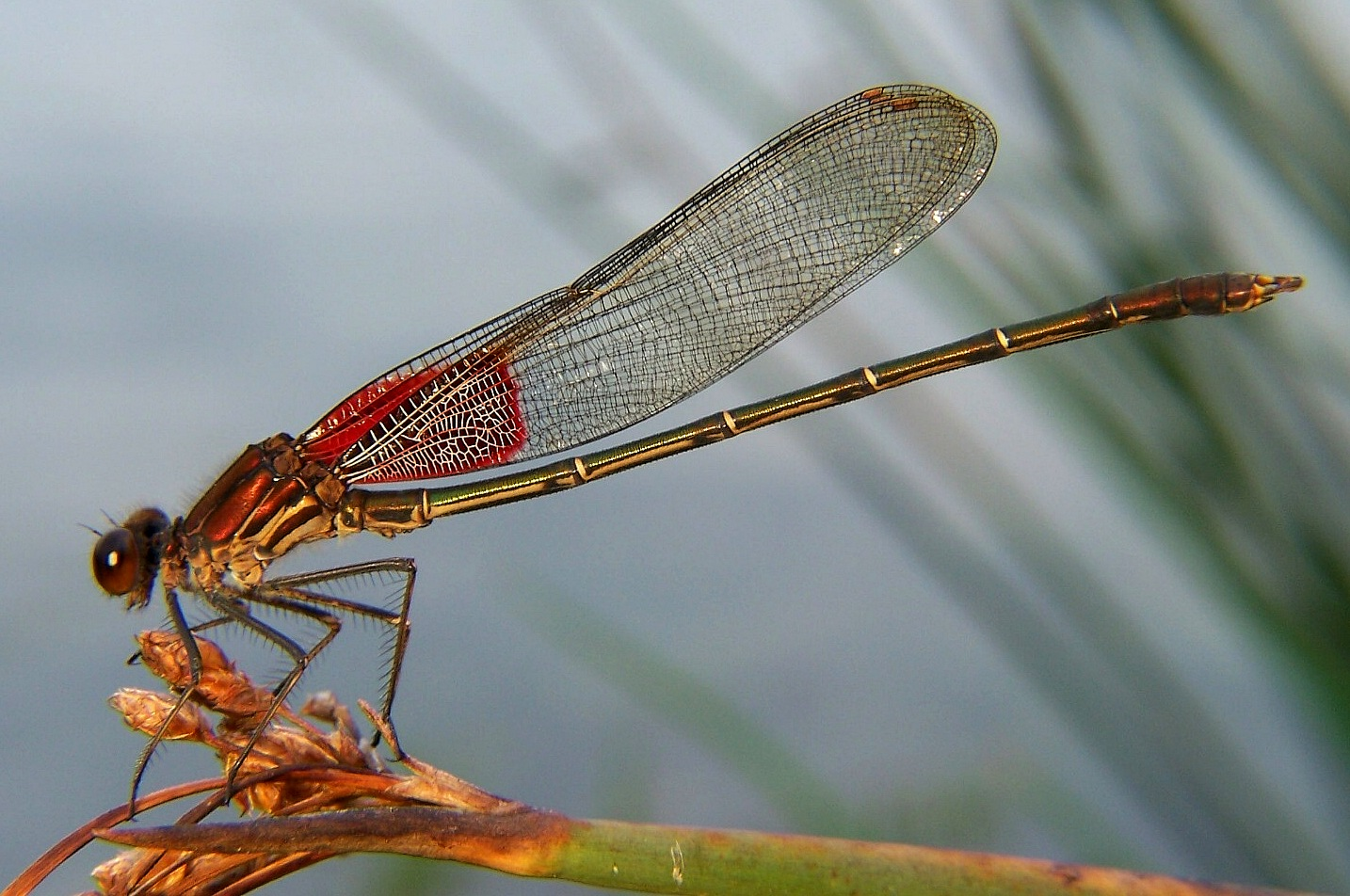

Scientific classification
- Kingdom: Animalia
- Phylum: Arthropoda
- Clade: Pancrustacea
- Class: Insecta
- Order: Odonata
- Suborder: Zygoptera
- Family: Calopterygidae
- Genus: Hetaerina
- Species: H. americana

Binomial name
- Hetaerina americana (Fabricius, 1798)
- Range of H. americana

= American rubyspot =

Species of damselfly

The American rubyspot (Hetaerina americana) is a damselfly of the family Calopterygidae. Males have a lustrous red head and thorax and a large red spot at the base of each wing. The abdomen of both genders is brilliant green. The female may have either green or copper colored marks on the thorax and possess faint amber wing spots with patterned bodies that vary from brown to green. The species has served as a widely used model system in studies of sexual selection, territorial behavior, and population genetics.

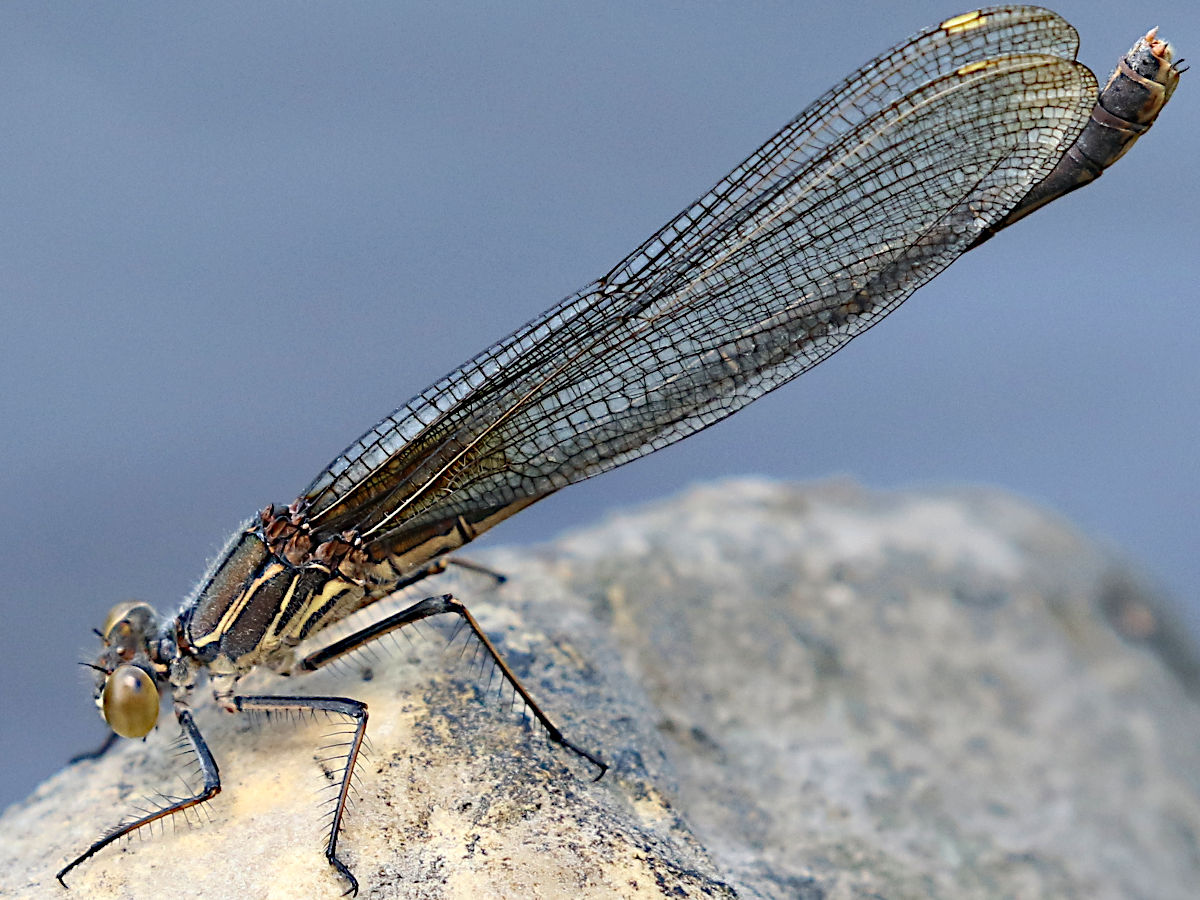
Female copper form

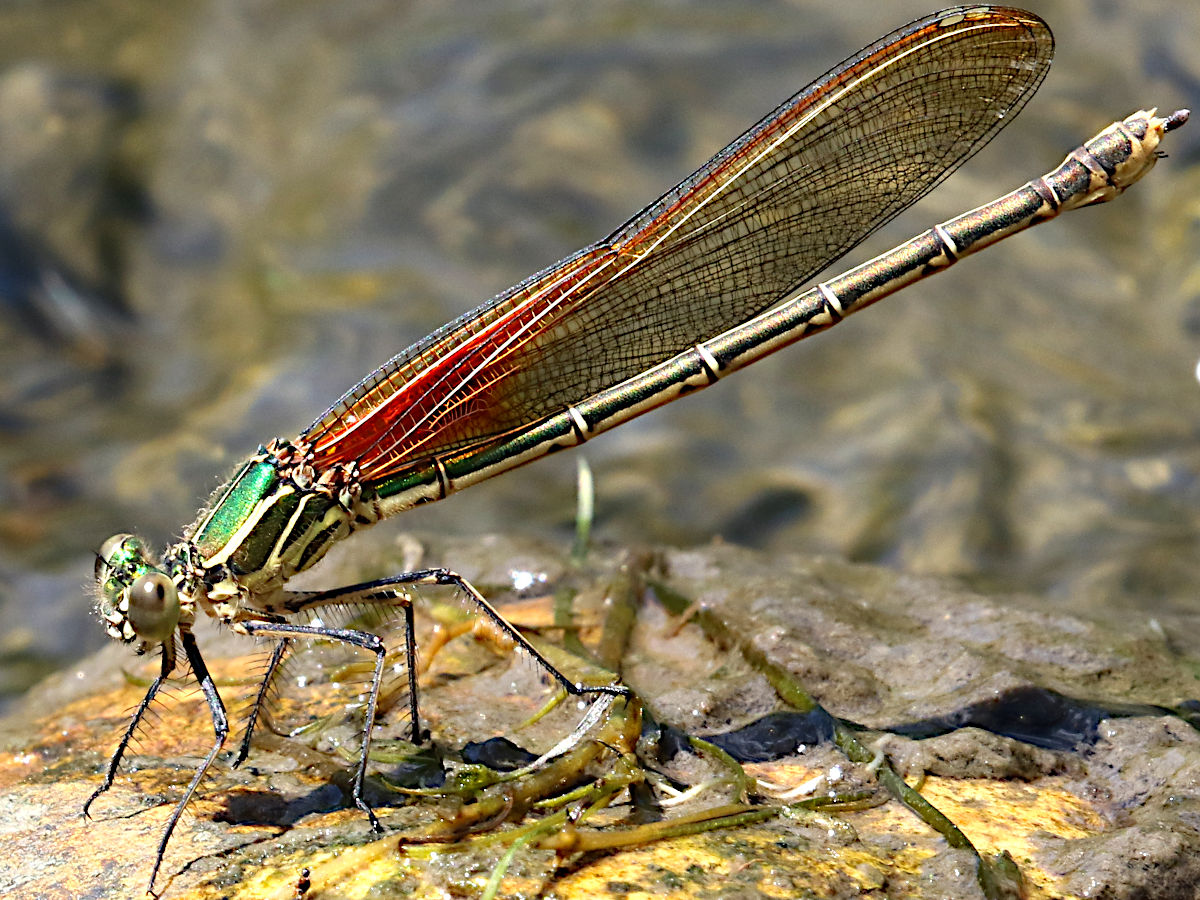
Female green form

== Etymology ==
The name highlights this damselfly's status as the most widespread of the North American rubyspots.

== Taxonomy ==
Hetaerina americana was first formally described by Fabricius in 1798. It is one of 37 sexually dichromatic species in the genus Hetaerina. Most rubyspots are concentrated in the neotropical region, with the greatest number of species found in South America. Members of the genus Hetaerina are difficult to identify because they closely resemble each other in body size, coloration, and habitat use. The most reliable way to distinguish species is through the shape of male caudal appendages, the structures at the tip of the abdomen used to grasp females during mating. H. americana itself shows considerable variation in the shape of these appendages, as well as in other traits such as the presence or the absence of the pterostigma and the relative extent of the red wing spot. It is because of this variability, that several names were applied to what are now considered the same species, including H. pseudoamericana, H. texana, and H. californica.

== Distribution and habitat ==
H. americana occupies a broad geographic range from northern Central America to southeastern Canada, inhabiting a variety of environments from temperate woodland to tropical forest. It has been recorded from across the United States except Washington and Idaho, and is frequently the abundant odonate species in areas where it occurs alongside other rubyspot species. Both males and females remain closely tied to running water throughout their adult lives, rarely moving more than a few meters from suitable stream habitat, and all mating activities take place at said streams. At study sites in California, adults are active from April through November, with peak activity occurring in June and August.

== Life cycle ==
H. americana undergoes a multistage life cycle that begins in its aquatic environment and concludes with a reproductively-active adult phase at the water's surface. Unlike many temperate damselflies, H. americana is not constrained by winter diapause, meaning adults can be found throughout the year and larvae are free to adjust the pace of their development in response to available resources rather than seasonal deadlines.

Females deposit their eggs in submerged vegetation, diving completely beneath the water's surface to do so. Following hatching, larvae develop through a series of aquatic instars. The larvae act as predators in the stream and can be observed growing from a diet consisting of Artemia salina, commonly known as brine shrimp. The duration of this larval period is flexible and strongly shaped by food availability. Under poor nutritional conditions, larvae take longer to complete development compared to larvae raised on richer diets.

Once a larva completes its final instar, it emerges from the water and enters the teneral stage, a brief period in which the exoskeleton hardens, and the individual begins accumulating fat reserves and muscle mass needed for adult territorial competition. This teneral stage lasts approximately six days and is followed by a young adult stage of roughly six to eight additional days before sexual maturity is reached. During this maturation window, male wing spots gradually develop as red pigment fills the cells at the base of the forewings, reaching a stable terminal size by approximately 12 to 14 days after emergence.

== Behavior ==
H. americana operate under a lek mating system, where groups of males gather along streams and compete for small perching territories where females arrive to mate and lay eggs. Females do not receive any resources or parental care from their mates and typically deposit their eggs outside of their mate's territory.

Territorial males defend their territories only during the portion of the day when females are reproductively active. Males defend their territories in different ways: chasing, in which the territory holder flies directly toward the intruding male to drive it out; slamming, in which the resident attempts to physically ram the intruder; and grabbing, in which the resident lands on the intruder. Territory sizes range from approximately 1 to 4 square meters, and resident males return to defend the same location each day until they are displaced or die. Resident males are stationary unless mating or fighting, typically choosing spots with direct sunlight and nearby rippling water. Non-territorial males tend to occupy areas with slower-moving water or spots with less sunlight. When a mature male enters the territory of a territorial male, the resident will immediately try to chase them out, whereas non-territorial males rarely start chases and instead chose to retreat when confronted.

=== Interspecific interactions ===
In areas of sympatry with other Hetaerina species, H. americana males engage in interspecific territorial encounters. These encounters include chasing, slamming, and grabbing, but these occur less often than would be expected based on each species' relative abundance. The reason for this reduction depends on which species is present. When co-occurring with Heterina titia, a species with extensive black wing pigmentation, H. americana is able to visually distinguish the two species and directs reduced aggression toward H. titia males. In contrast, when co-occurring with Hetarina cruentata - a species similarly colored - H. americana cannot distinguish between the two species by appearance, and instead the reduction in heterospecific fights is achieved through microhabitat partitioning. H. cruentata occupies shadier perches with greater canopy cover than H. americana, reducing the rate at which the two species encounter each other.

== Mating ==
A complete mating sequence in H. americana involves eight sequential stages. First the male clasps the female from behind using his abdominal appendages, then the pair enters a precopulatory tandem flight. The male initiates copulation by fluttering his wings and pulling the female forward; copulation occurs, during which the male removes the females stored sperm from previous matings before depositing his own. Males remove 80-100% of the sperm stored by the female through this process. The pair makes the postcopulatory tandem flight, and the female is then released, submerging herself in water to look for a place to deposit her eggs. The female probes submerged vegetation with her ovipositor, and upon finding a preferred spot, she oviposits.

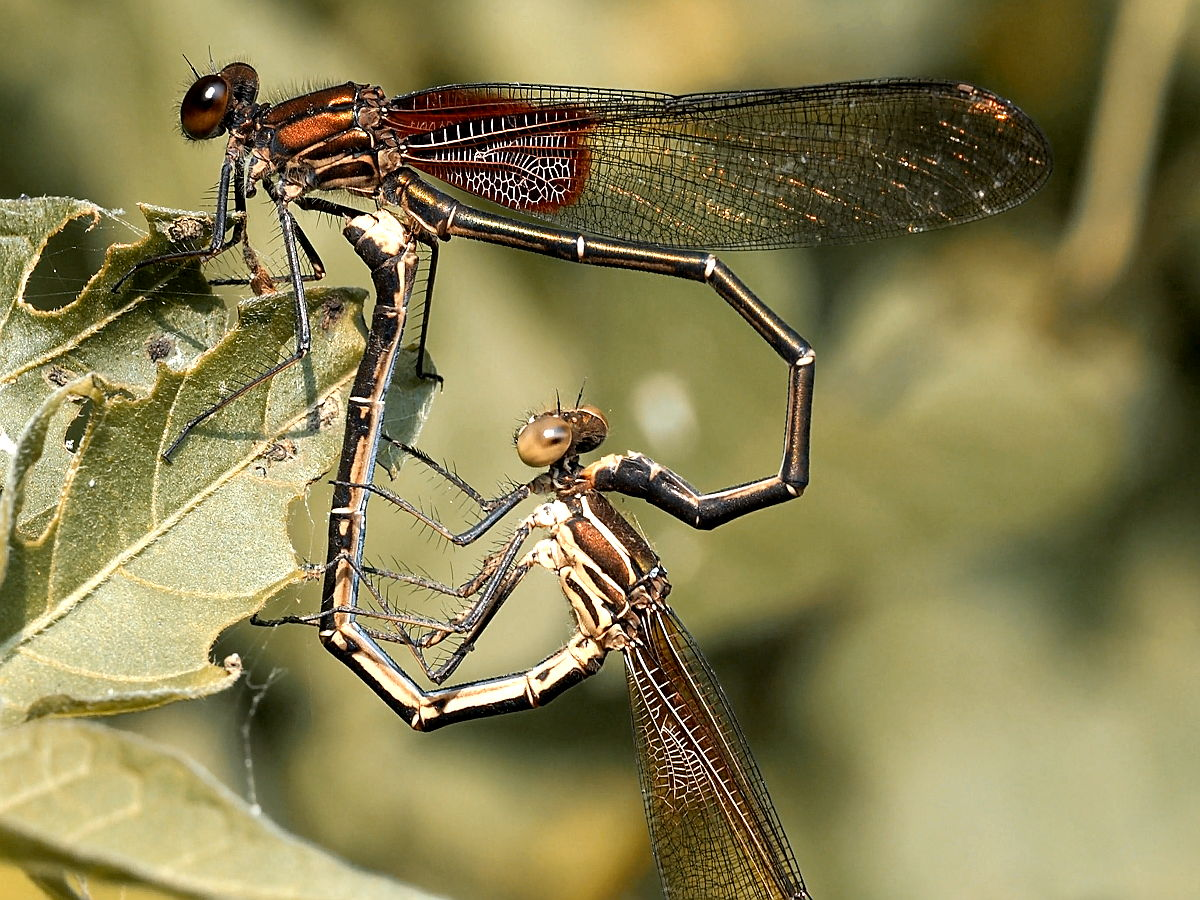
Male above, female below

Mating wheel; sperm removal

== Sexual selection ==
Observational selection gradient analyses and controlled wing spot manipulation experiments confirm that the male wing spot is under direct, positive sexual selection through male competition for territories, rather than female preference. Males with larger natural wing spots hold territories for a greater portion of their reproductive lives compared to males with smaller spots. Higher overall mating rates are observed with large-spotted males because of their greater territory control, but wing spot size has no detectable effect on how often a male mates per day, ruling out direct female choice as the mechanism.

Further studies then conclude that the agonistic handicap model is consistent with all the data from H. americana. Under this model, a trait that has no direct effect on fighting ability can still evolve as an honest signal of fighting ability. In H. americana, experimentally enlarged wing spots caused higher male mortality, confirming that there is a real cost, while males with naturally large spots lived longer despite this cost. This makes the wing spot an honest signal that only males of genuinely high quality can sustain without a net loss in fitness.

Research shows that the color of the spot is not an indicator of male quality in H. americana.

== Physiology and condition ==
Male H. americana develop a red wing spot shortly after emerging as adults. The spot starts out as an area of pink-colored veins at the base of the forewings, and over roughly two weeks the cells in this area fill with red pigment until the spot reaches its full size. Once this development is complete, the spot stays the same size for the rest of the male's life.

Within the group of territorial males, those with bigger wing spots also tend to have stronger immune responses and higher fat reserves, suggesting that spot size reliably reflects a male's overall condition. It's worth noting that this connection disappears in non-territorial males, pointing to the idea that the signal only works as an honest indicator when the male is healthy enough to maintain it.

During the time a male holds a territory, his immune function stays fairly stable from day to day. After a long and exhausting fight, both immune function and fat reserves drop sharply, falling even lower than the levels seen in non-territorial males who had not recently fought. The reason fat and immune function are so closely linked is that fat is involved in producing the proteins that power the immune system, so when fat runs low, so does immune ability.

== Conservation ==
Climate modeling research predicts significant changes to the distribution and habitat of H. americana and its close relatives. Using MaxEnt species distribution models applied across three future climate scenarios, scientists observed that Hetaerina as a group is expected to experience an overall increase in habitat suitability and a slight expansion in range size, with the center of its distribution shifting northward by approximately 137 km. Temperature was identified as the single most important environmental predictor of these changes, consistent with the species' sensitivity to stream thermal conditions. Under the most severe emissions scenario, habitat sustainability gains for the Hetaerina species could reach as high as +38%.

Despite these overall gains in suitability, suitable habitat is predicted to fragment into smaller, geographically isolated patches as distributions shift northward. This fragmentation could restrict gene flow among H. americana populations and reduce genetic diversity, increasing long term extinction risk. Conservation of stream connectivity and water quality is suggested to be necessary for facilitating northward range shifts limiting additional stressors, such as agricultural runoff, that could further reduce available habitat.
