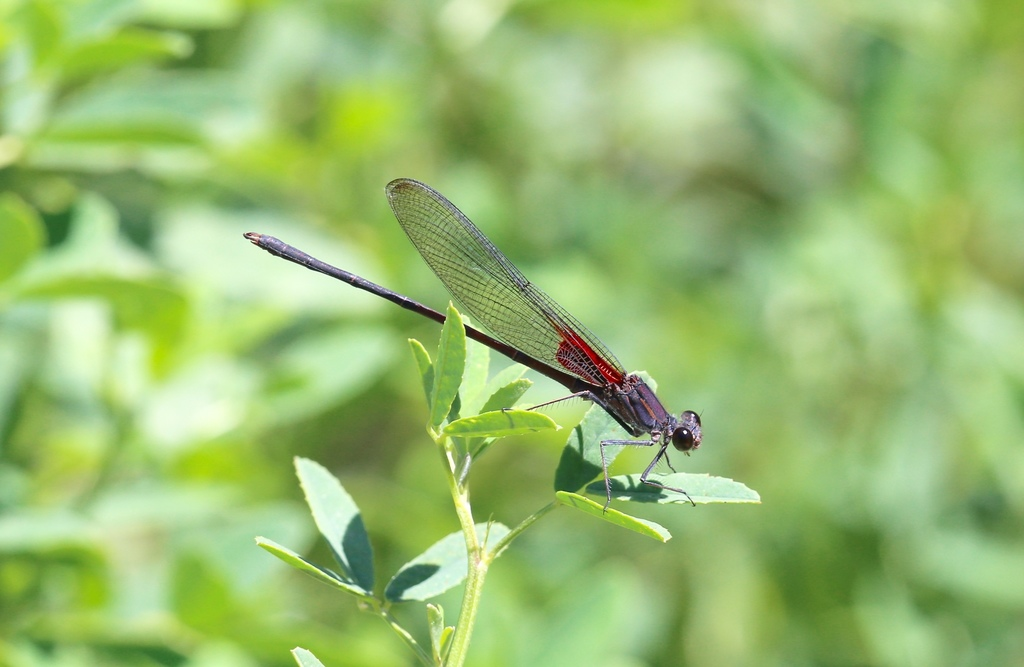

Conservation status
- Least Concern (IUCN 3.1)

Scientific classification
- Domain: Eukaryota
- Kingdom: Animalia
- Phylum: Arthropoda
- Class: Insecta
- Order: Odonata
- Suborder: Zygoptera
- Family: Calopterygidae
- Genus: Hetaerina
- Species: H. vulnerata

Binomial name
- Hetaerina vulnerata Hagen in Selys, 1853

= Hetaerina vulnerata =

Species of damselfly

Hetaerina vulnerata, the canyon rubyspot, is a species of broad-winged damselfly in the family Calopterygidae. It is found in Central America, North America, and South America.

The IUCN conservation status of Hetaerina vulnerata is "LC", least concern, with no immediate threat to the species' survival. The population is stable.
