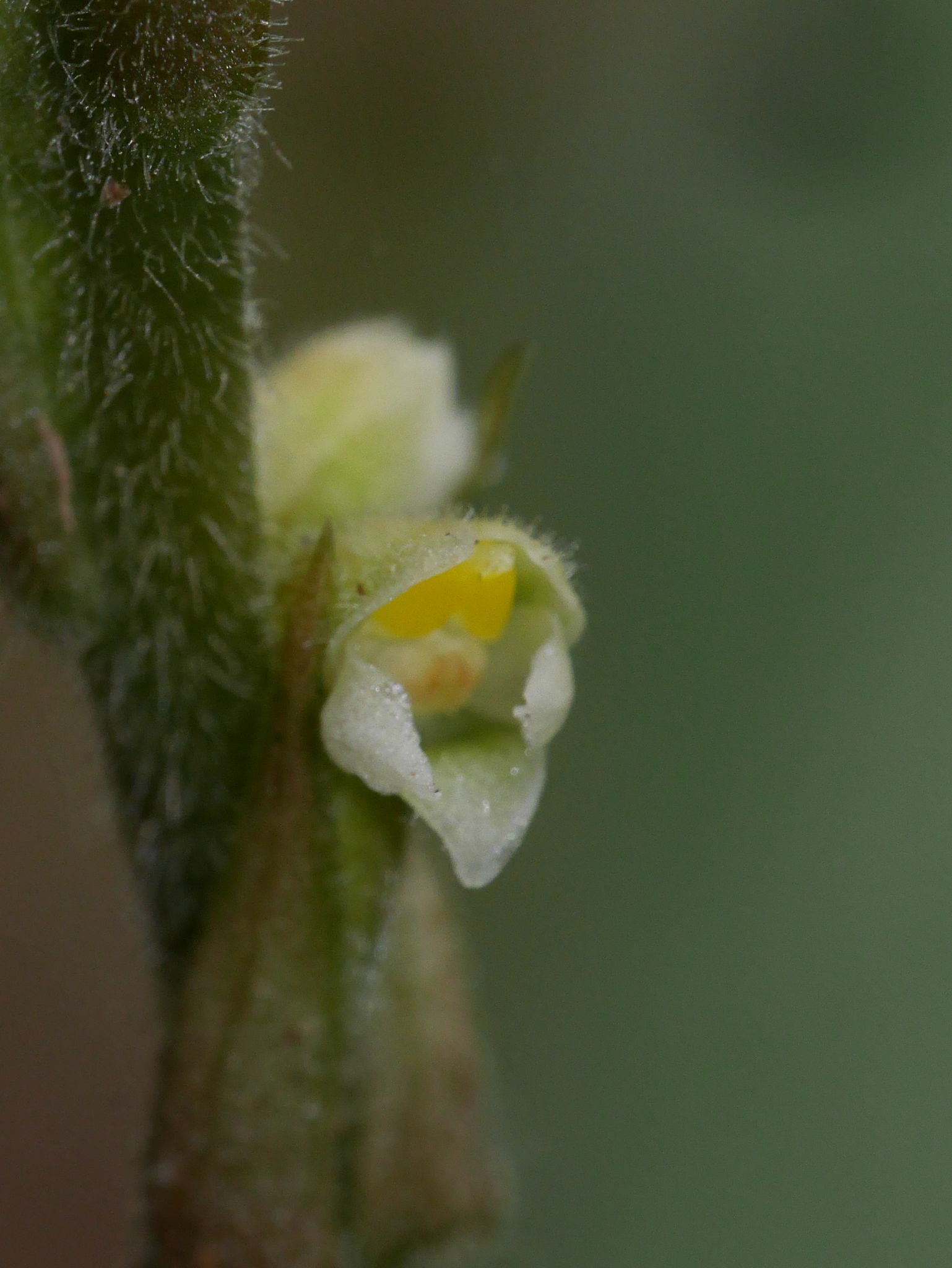
- Flower

Scientific classification
- Kingdom: Plantae
- Clade: Embryophytes
- Clade: Tracheophytes
- Clade: Spermatophytes
- Clade: Angiosperms
- Clade: Monocots
- Order: Asparagales
- Family: Orchidaceae
- Subfamily: Orchidoideae
- Tribe: Cranichideae
- Genus: Hetaeria
- Species: H. oblongifolia

Binomial name
- Hetaeria oblongifolia Blume

Synonyms
- List: Epipactis discoidea (Rchb.f.) A.A.Eaton; Epipactis erimae (Schltr.) A.A.Eaton; Goodyera discoidea (Rchb.f.) Schltr.; Goodyera erimae Schltr.; Goodyera ovalifolia Wight; Hetaeria discoidea (Rchb.f.) Schltr.; Hetaeria erimae (Schltr.) Schltr.; Hetaeria forcipata Rchb.f.; Hetaeria helferi Hook.f.; Hetaeria micrantha Blume; Hetaeria nitida Ridl.; Hetaeria ovalifolia (Wight); Hetaeria pauciseta J.J.Sm.; Hetaeria raymundii Schltr.; Hetaeria rubicunda Rchb.f.; Hetaeria samoensis Rolfe; Hetaeria similis Schltr.; Hetaeria tenuis (Lindl.) Benth.; Rhamphidia discoidea Rchb.f.; Rhamphidia ovalifolia (Wight) Lindl.; Rhamphidia rubicunda (Rchb.f.) Rchb.f.; Rhamphidia tenuis Lindl.

= Hetaeria oblongifolia =

Hairy jewel orchid

Species of orchid

Hetaeria oblongifolia, commonly known as hairy jewel orchid, is a species of orchid that is native to Southeast Asia, New Guinea and Queensland, Australia. It has between four and eight egg-shaped, dark green leaves and up to forty five small, hairy green and white flowers with a deep pouch near the base of the labellum.

== Description ==
Hetaeria oblongifolia is a tuberous, perennial herb with a loose rosette of between four and eight dark green, egg-shaped leaves, 50–80 mm (2–3 in) long and 25–35 mm (0.98–1.4 in) wide. Between fifteen and forty five non-resupinate, hairy green and white flowers, 4–4.5 mm (0.16–0.18 in) long and 6–7 mm (0.2–0.3 in) wide are borne on a hairy flowering stem 150–300 mm (6–10 in) tall. The dorsal sepal is egg-shaped, about 3.5 mm (0.1 in) long, 2.5 mm (0.1 in) wide and forms a hood over the column. The lateral sepals are about 4 mm (0.2 in) long, 2.2 mm (0.09 in) wide and project forwards. The petals are about 4 mm (0.2 in) long, 1.3 mm (0.05 in) wide and turn inwards near their tip. The labellum is white with a yellow patch, about 3.5 mm (0.1 in) long, 2.5 mm (0.1 in) wide with inrolled edges and a deep pouch at its base. Flowering occurs from July to October.

== Taxonomy and naming ==
Hetaeria oblongifolia was first formally described in 1825 by Carl Ludwig Blume and the description was published in Bijdragen tot de Flora van Nederlandsch Indie. The specific epithet (oblongifolia) is derived from the Latin words oblongus meaning "elongated" and folium meaning "leaf".

== Distribution and habitat ==
Hairy jewel orchid usually grows on sheltered slopes in rainforest and near streams. It is found in Indonesia, Malaysia, New Guinea, New Caledonia, the Philippines, the Solomon Islands, Thailand, Vanuatu and in Queensland between the Kutini-Payamu National Park and Rockhampton.

== Gallery ==
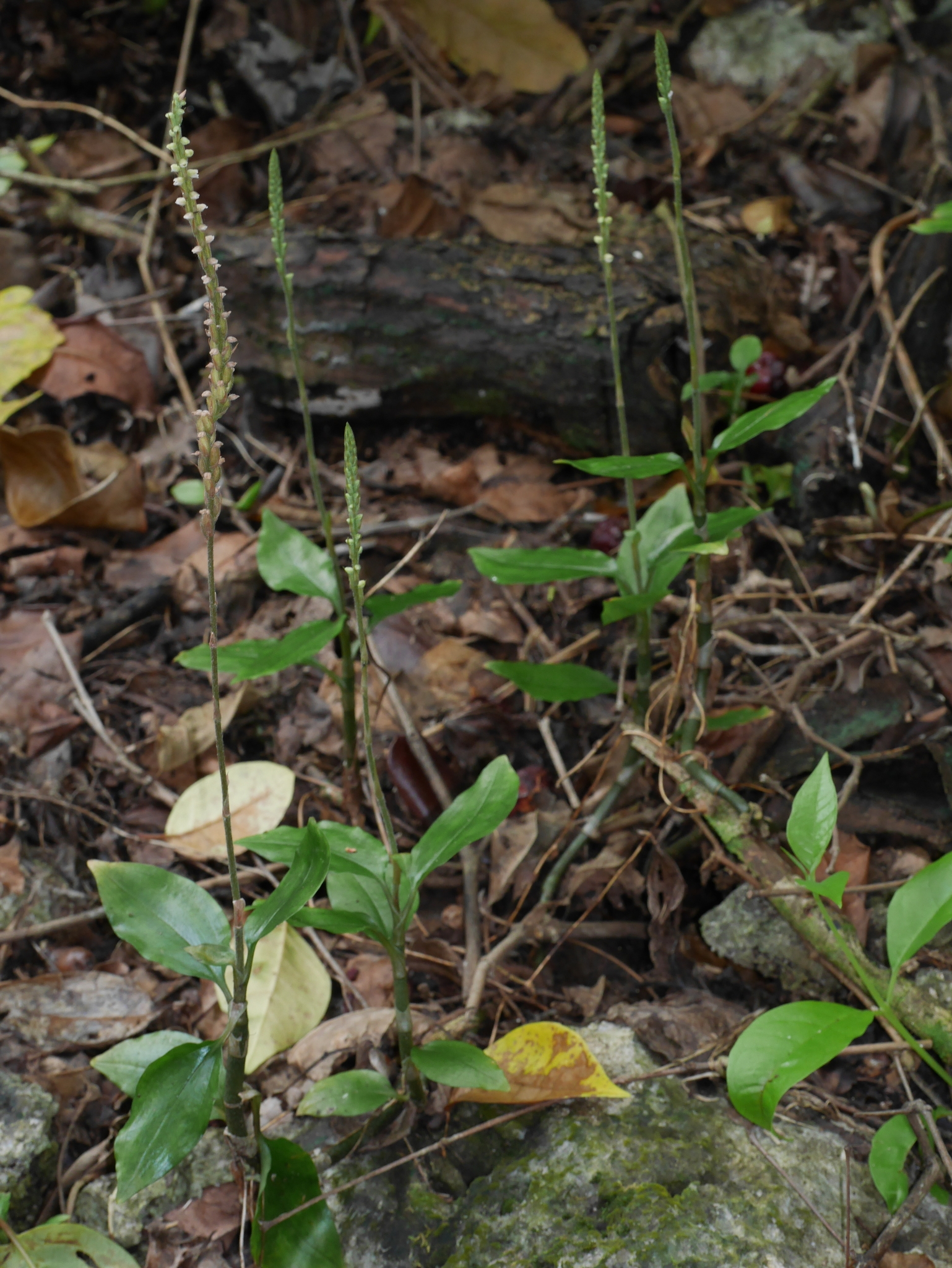
Group of flowering individuals on Niue.

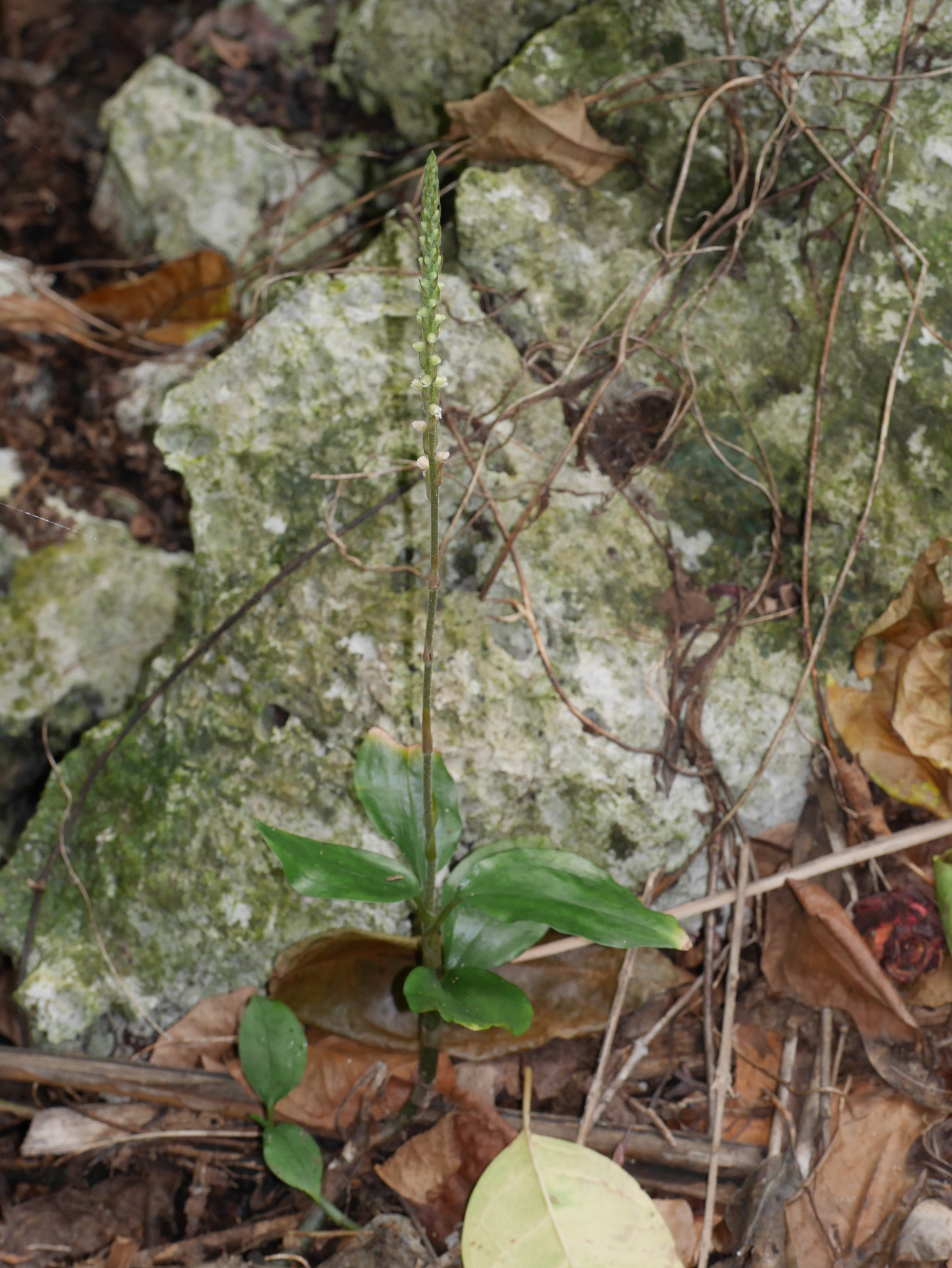
A single flowering individual on Niue.

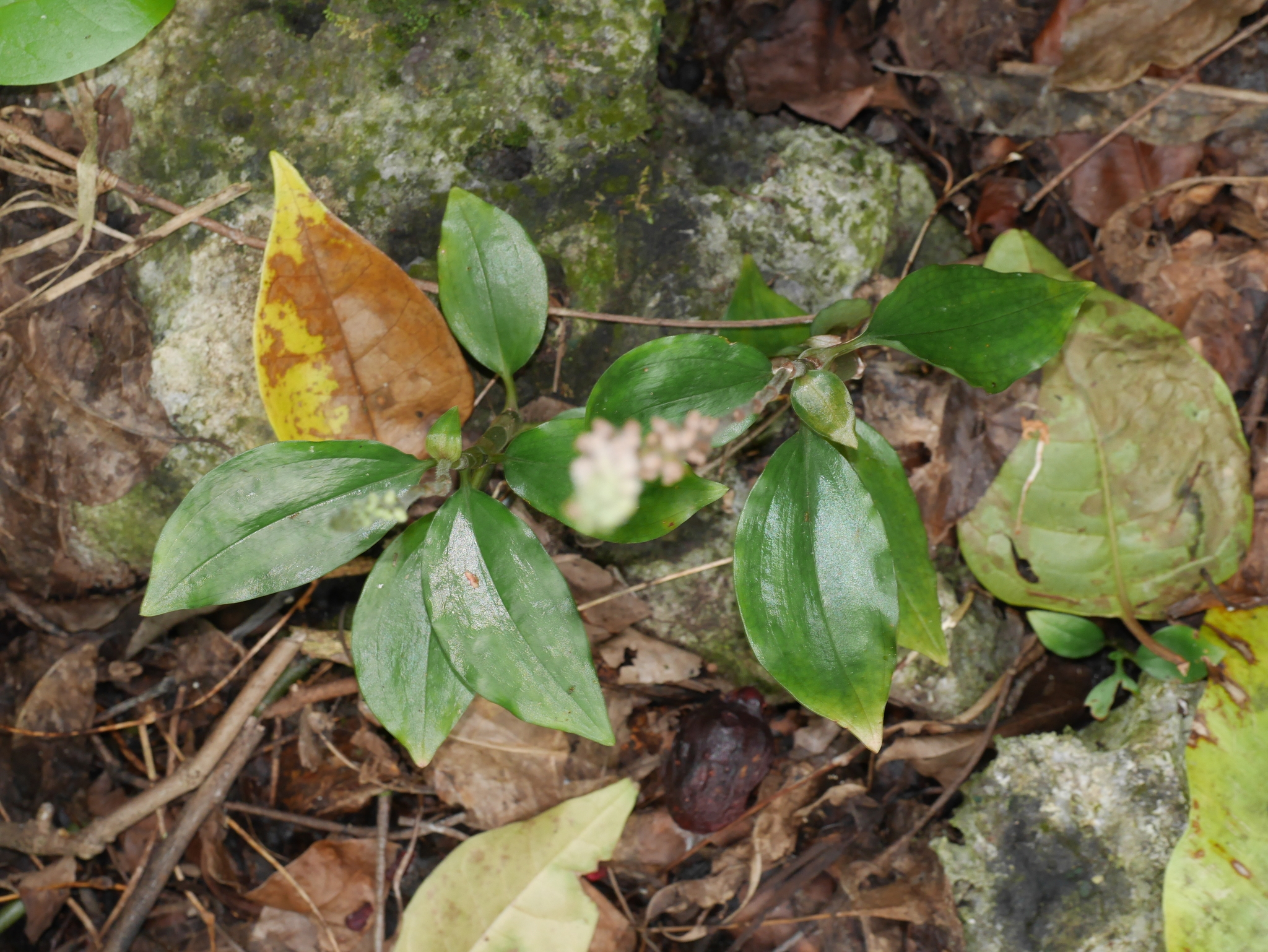
Top view of leaves.

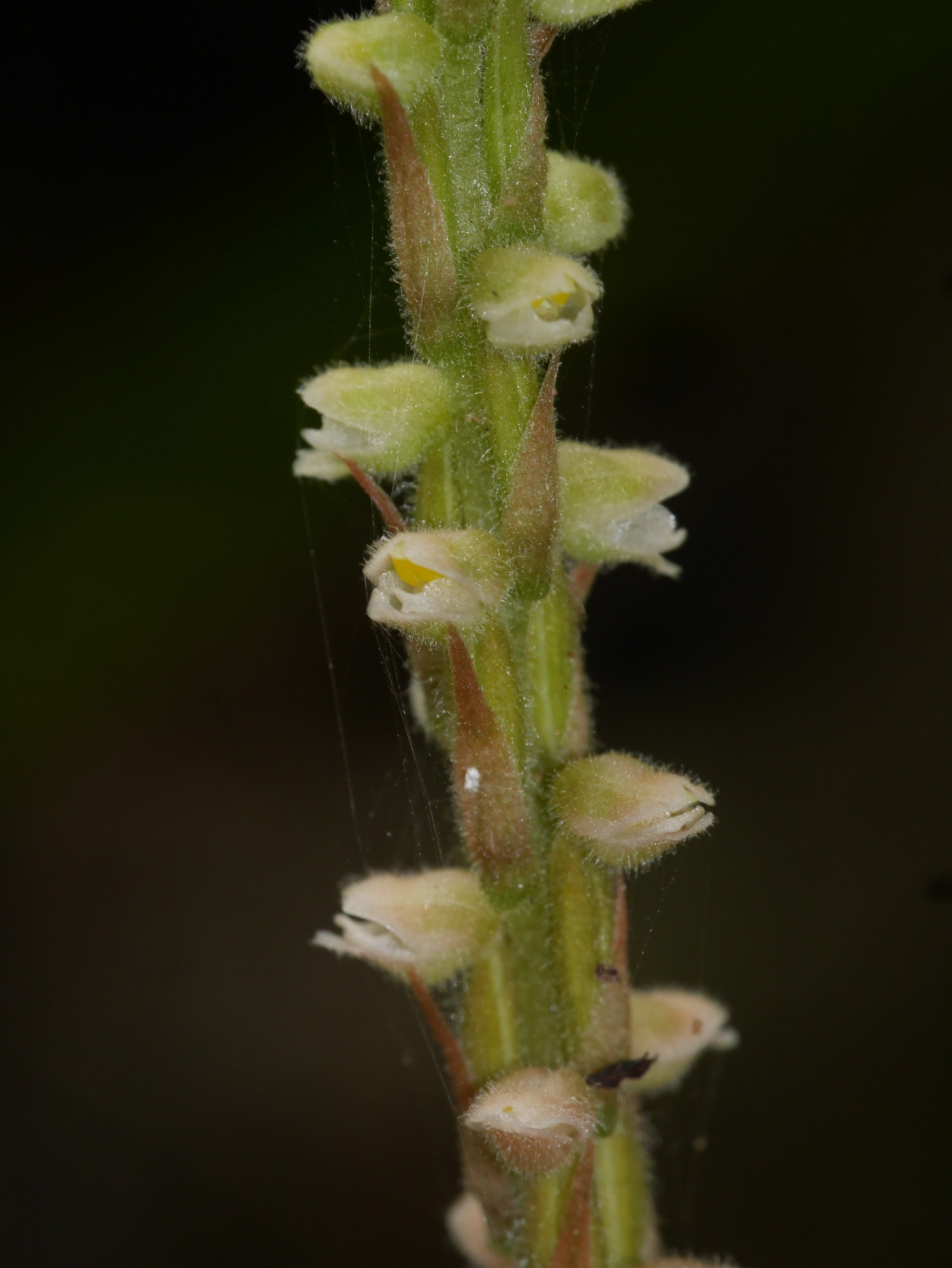
Inflorescence.

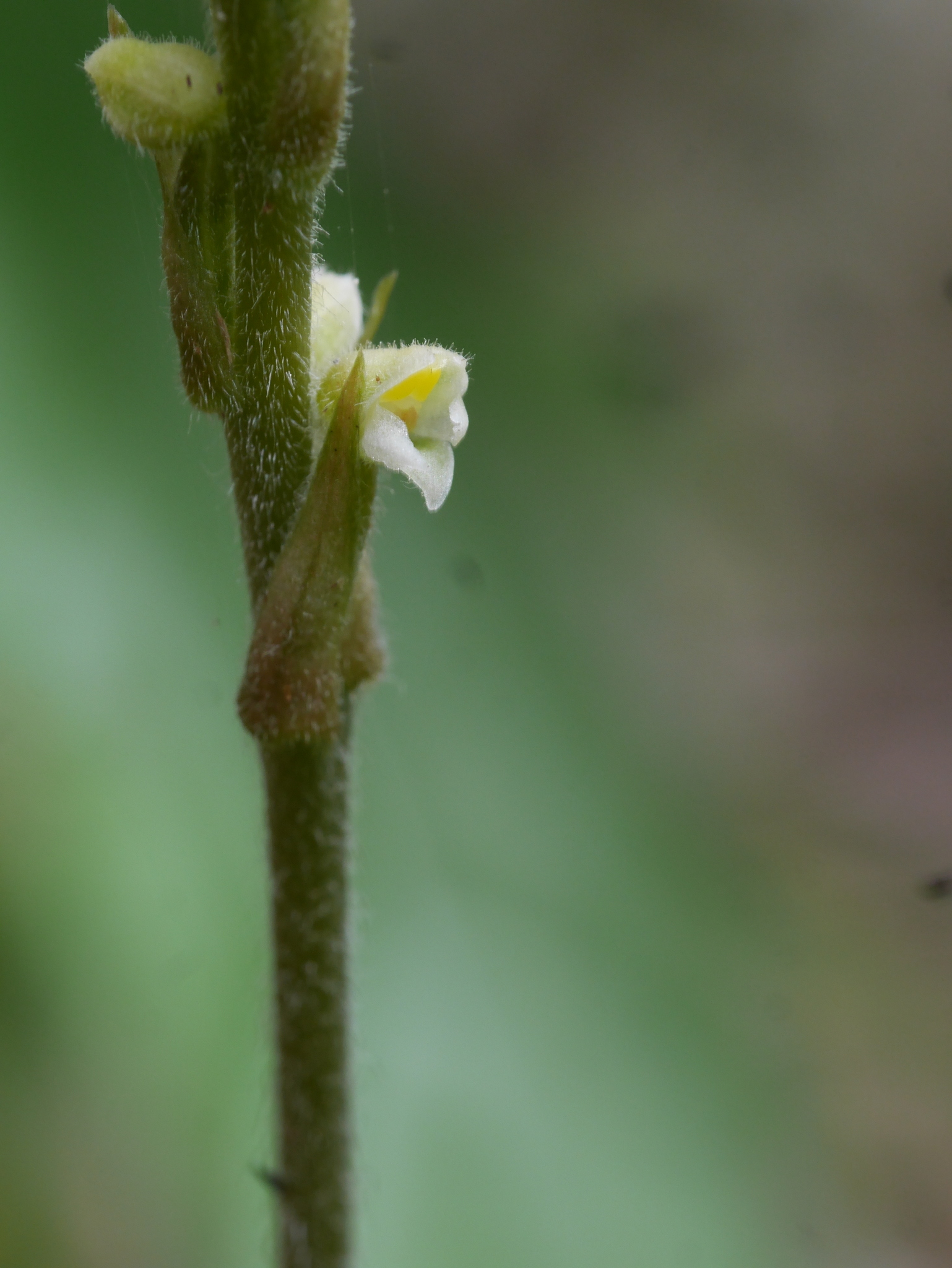
Inflorescence closeup.
