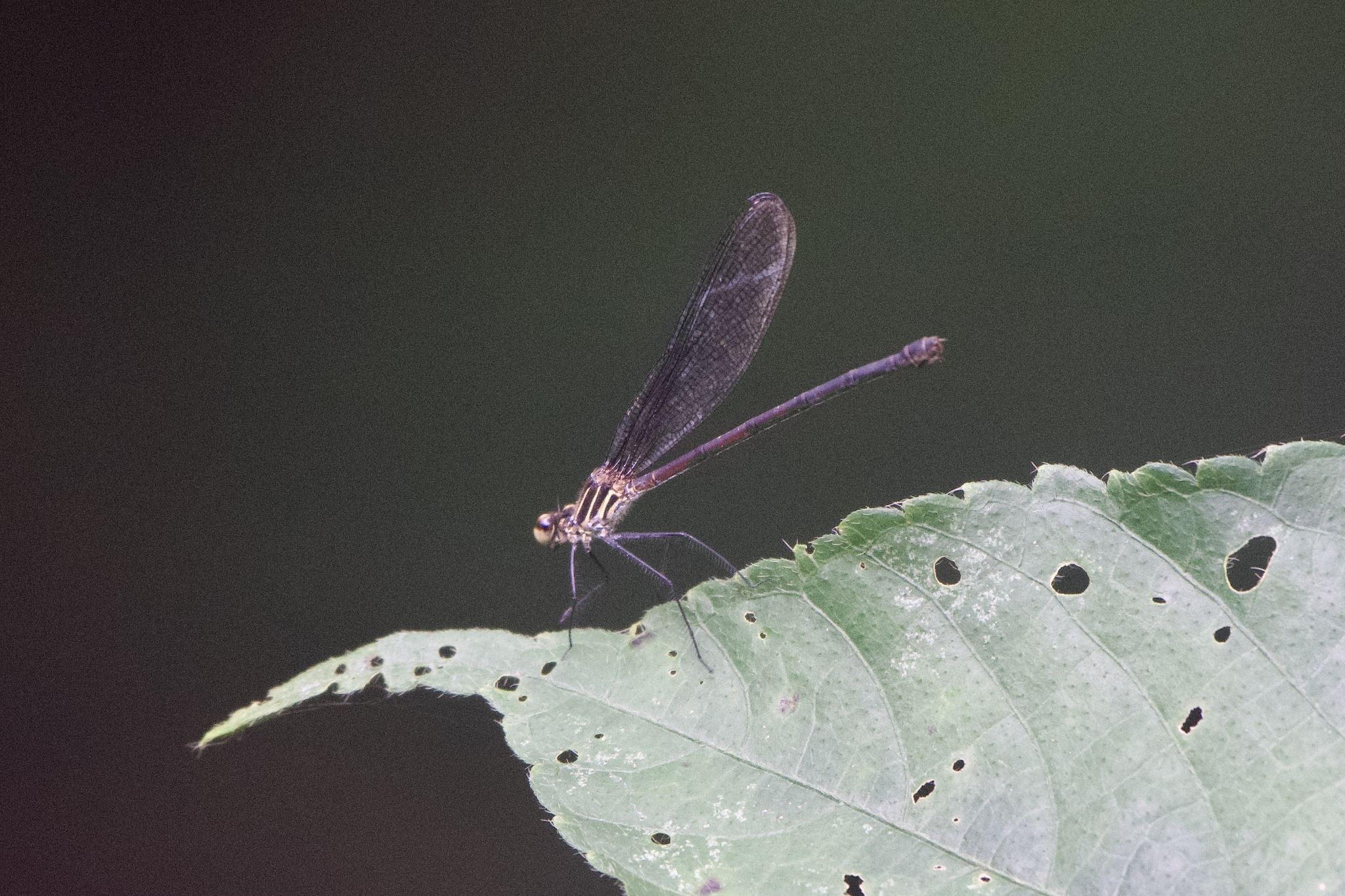

Scientific classification
- Kingdom: Animalia
- Phylum: Arthropoda
- Class: Insecta
- Order: Odonata
- Suborder: Zygoptera
- Family: Calopterygidae
- Genus: Hetaerina
- Species: H. miniata

Binomial name
- Hetaerina miniata Selys, 1879

= Hetaerina miniata =

Species of insect

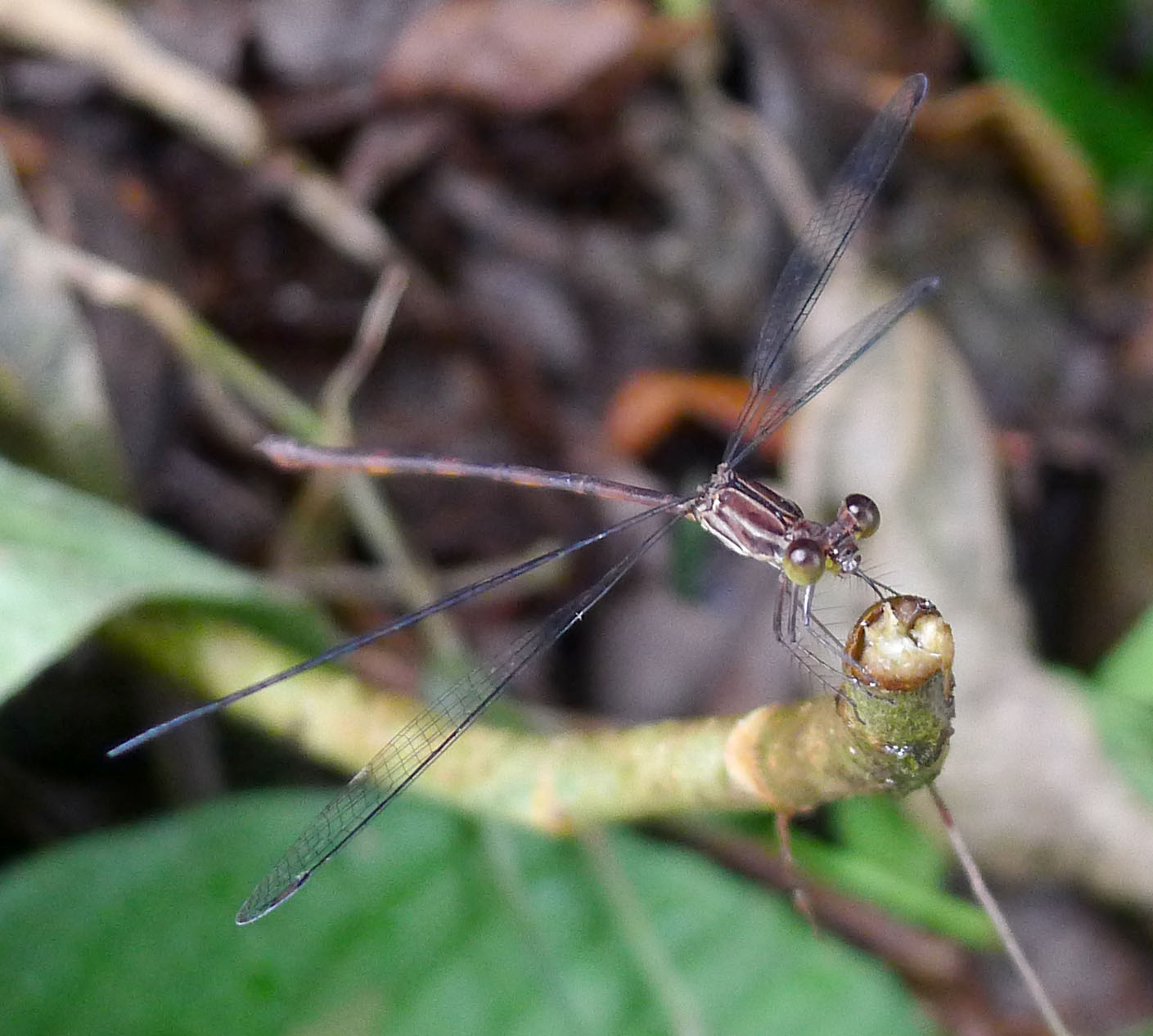
Hetaerina miniata^ Female. Selys, 1879 Calopterygidae - Flickr - gailhampshire (1).jpg

Hetaerina miniata, the red-striped rubyspot is a damselfly in the family Calopterygidae. The species was first described by Edmond de Sélys Longchamps in 1879.
