= Hetaerina rudis =

Conservation status
- Vulnerable (IUCN 3.1)

Scientific classification
- Kingdom: Animalia
- Phylum: Arthropoda
- Class: Insecta
- Order: Odonata
- Suborder: Zygoptera
- Family: Calopterygidae
- Genus: Hetaerina
- Species: H. rudis

Binomial name
- Hetaerina rudis Calvert, 1901

Species of damselfly

Hetaerina rudis is a species of damselfly in family Calopterygidae. It is found in Guatemala and Mexico. Its natural habitats are subtropical or tropical moist montane forests and rivers. It is threatened by habitat loss.
