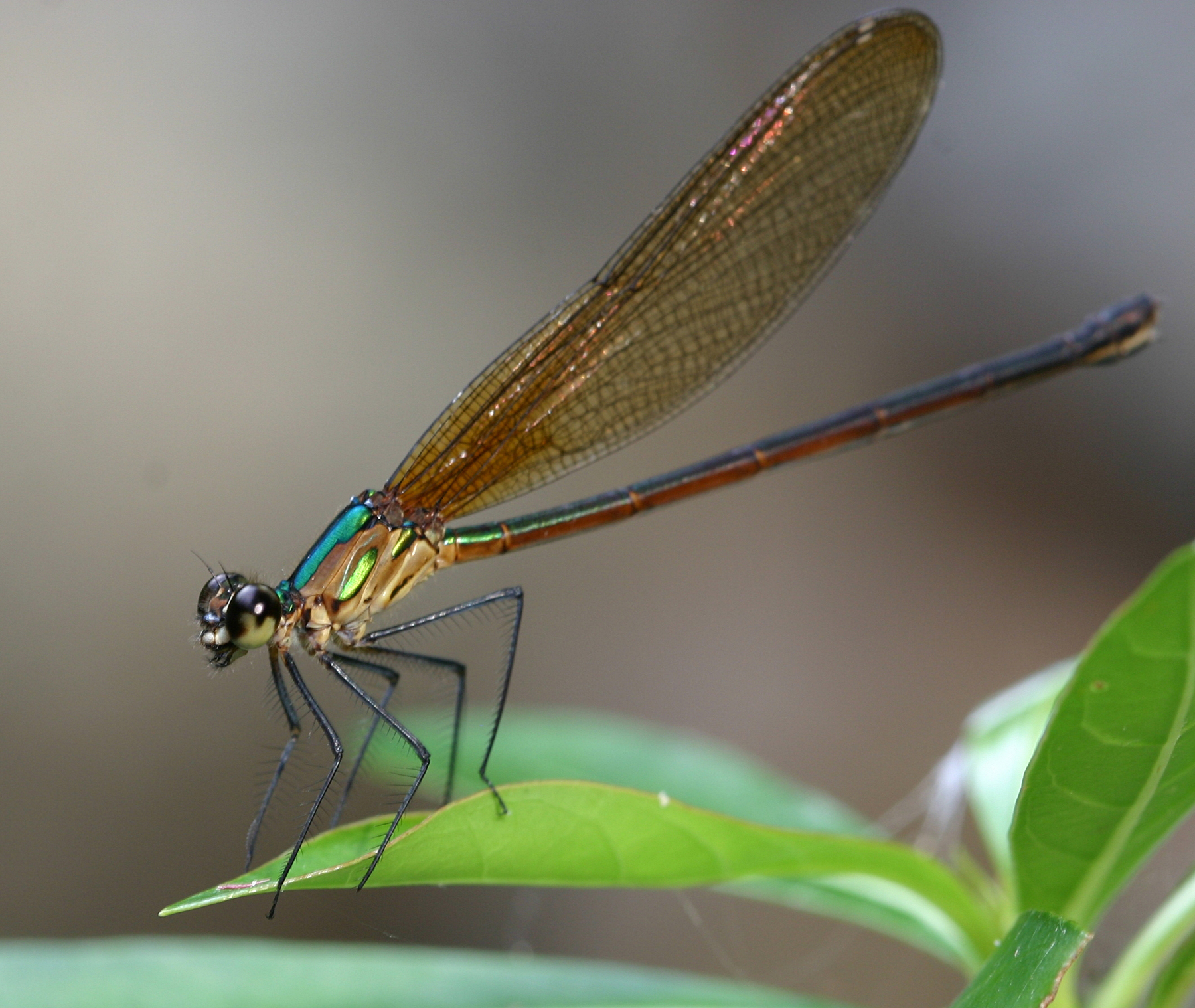

Conservation status
- Least Concern (IUCN 3.1)

Scientific classification
- Kingdom: Animalia
- Phylum: Arthropoda
- Class: Insecta
- Order: Odonata
- Suborder: Zygoptera
- Family: Calopterygidae
- Genus: Hetaerina
- Species: H. cruentata

Binomial name
- Hetaerina cruentata (Rambur, 1842)

Synonyms
- Hetaerina brasiliensis Selys, 1853; Hetaerina lineata Hagen, 1853; Hetaerina luteola Rambur, 1842

= Hetaerina cruentata =

Species of insect

Hetaerina cruentata is a species of broad-winged damselfly in the family Calopterygidae. It is found in Central and South America.

The IUCN conservation status of Hetaerina cruentata is "LC", least concern, with no immediate threat to the species' survival. The population is stable. The IUCN status was assessed in 2020.

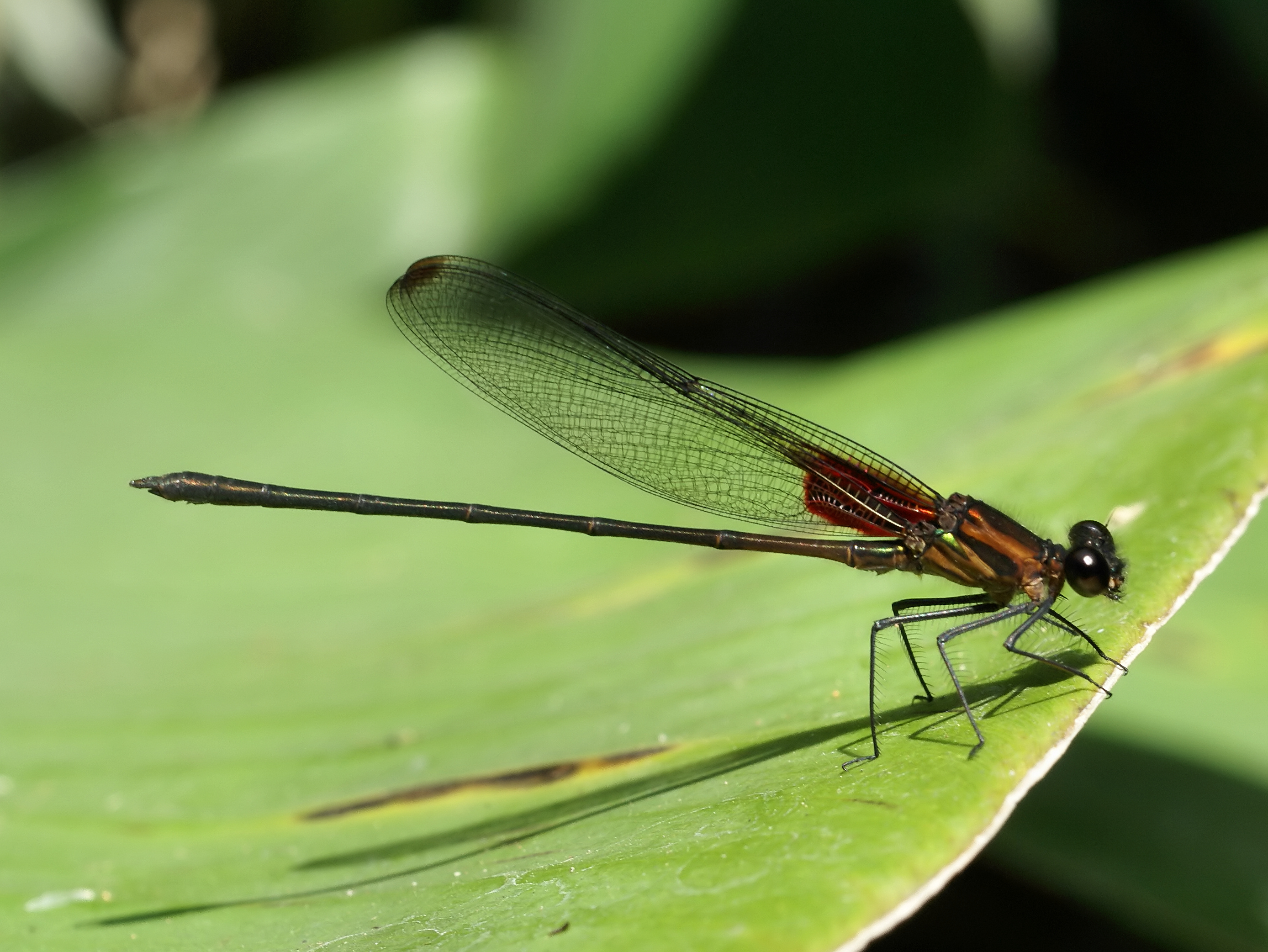
Hetaerina cruentata
