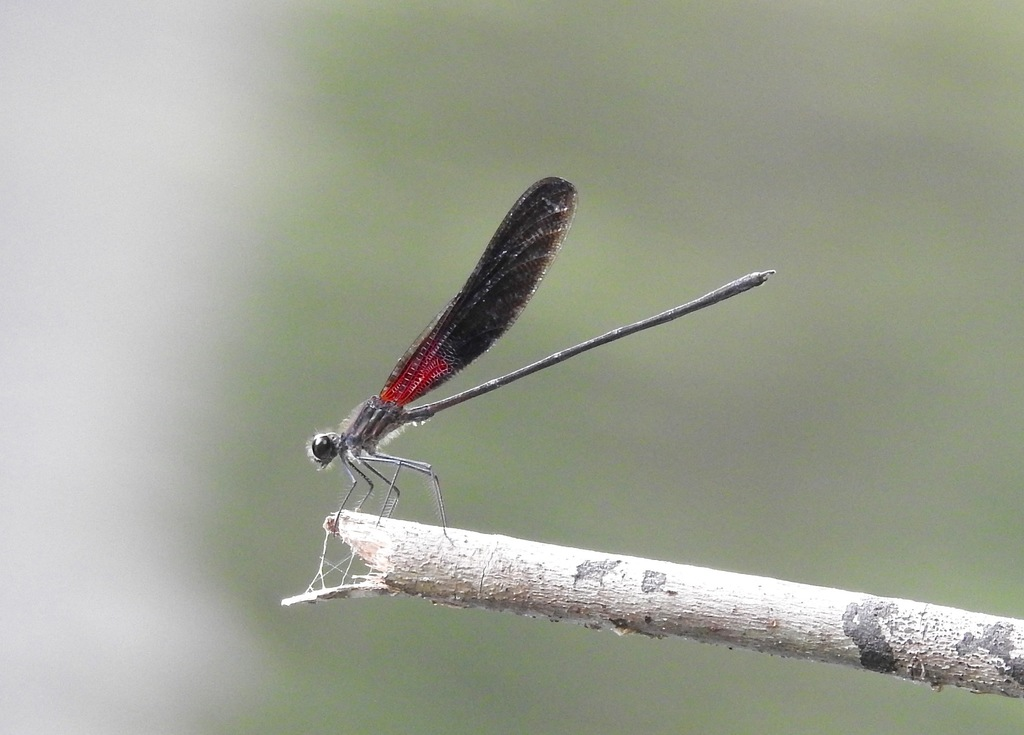

Conservation status
- Least Concern (IUCN 3.1)

Scientific classification
- Kingdom: Animalia
- Phylum: Arthropoda
- Class: Insecta
- Order: Odonata
- Suborder: Zygoptera
- Family: Calopterygidae
- Genus: Hetaerina
- Species: H. titia

Binomial name
- Hetaerina titia (Drury, 1773)

= Hetaerina titia =

Species of damselfly

Hetaerina titia, the smoky rubyspot, is a species of broad-winged damselfly in the family Calopterygidae. It is found in Central America and North America.

The IUCN conservation status of Hetaerina titia is "LC", least concern, with no immediate threat to the species' survival. The population is stable. The IUCN status was reviewed in 2018.
