= Hetaira (katydid) =

Scientific classification
- Domain: Eukaryota
- Kingdom: Animalia
- Phylum: Arthropoda
- Class: Insecta
- Order: Orthoptera
- Suborder: Ensifera
- Family: Tettigoniidae
- Subfamily: Phaneropterinae
- Subtribe: Pycnopalpina
- Genus: Hetaira; Brunner von Wattenwyl, 1891

Genus of cricket-like animals

Hetaira is a genus of Central and South American bush crickets in the subfamily Phaneropterinae.
