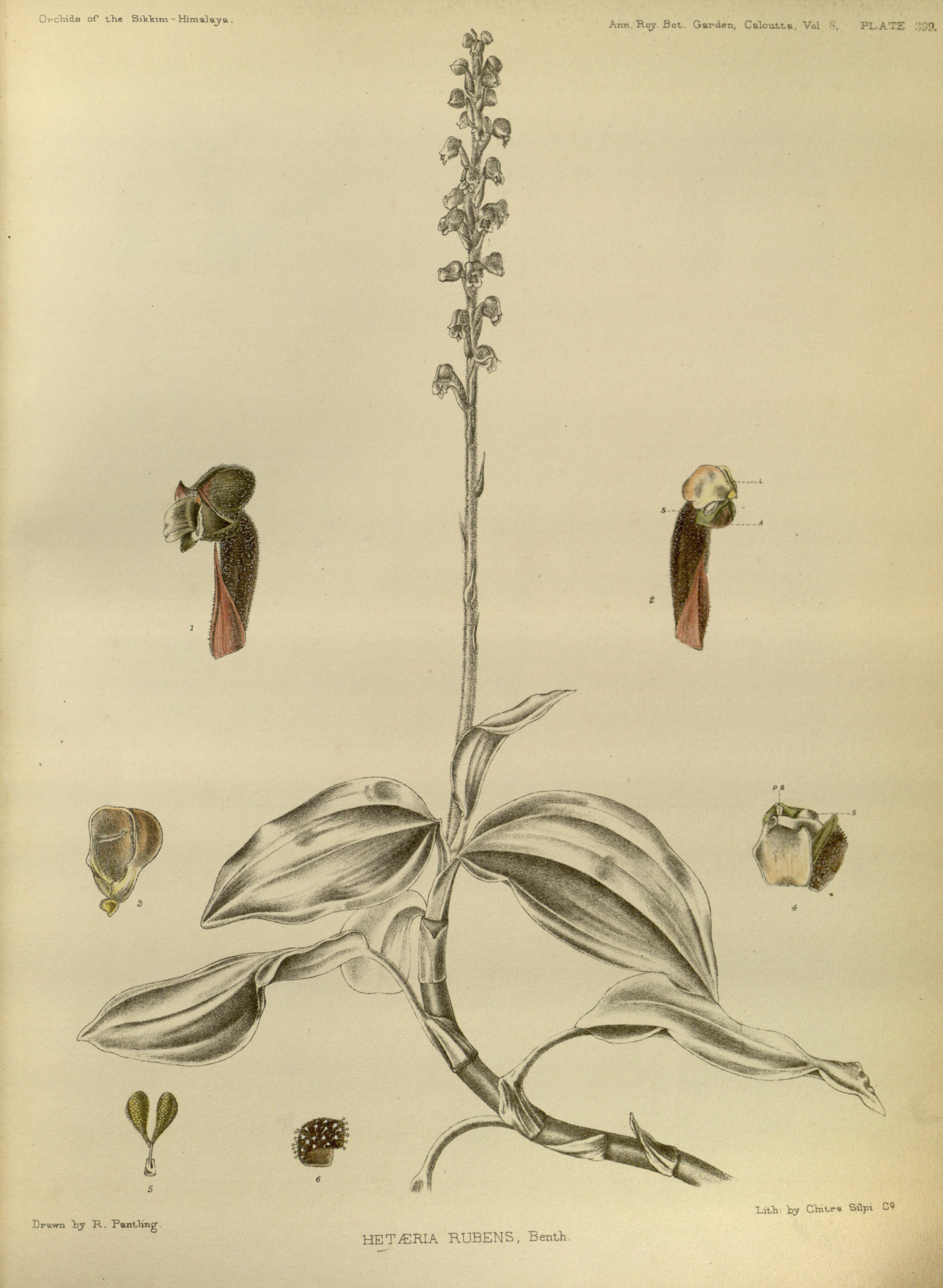
- Drawing of Hetaeria affinis

Scientific classification
- Kingdom: Plantae
- Clade: Tracheophytes
- Clade: Angiosperms
- Clade: Monocots
- Order: Asparagales
- Family: Orchidaceae
- Subfamily: Orchidoideae
- Tribe: Cranichideae
- Subtribe: Goodyerinae
- Genus: Hetaeria; Blume

Synonyms
- Etaeria Blume; Aetheria Endl.; Cerochilus Lindl.; Rhamphidia (Lindl.) Lindl.

= Hetaeria =

Hairy jewel orchids

Species of orchid

Hetaeria, commonly known as hairy jewel orchids, is a genus of about thirty species of flowering plants in the orchid family Orchidaceae. Plants in this genus are terrestrial herbs with a succulent rhizome and a loose rosette of leaves. Small, pale, hairy non-resupinate flowers are borne on a thin, hairy flowering stem. They are found in tropical Africa and Asia to New Guinea, Australia and some Pacific Islands.

== Description ==
Orchids in the genus Hetaeria are terrestrial, perennial, deciduous, sympodial herbs with a creeping, succulent, above-ground rhizome anchored to the ground by wiry roots. The leaves are dark green, usually narrow, thin-textured and arranged in a loose rosette with a short petiole-like base, the lower leaves usually withered by flowering time. The flowers are non-resupinate and usually small, dull-coloured and hairy with the dorsal sepal and petals joined to form a hood over the column. The labellum is glabrous and has a deep pouch near its base.

== Taxonomy and naming ==
The genus Hetaeria was first formally described in 1825 by Carl Ludwig Blume and the description was published in Bijdragen tot de flora van Nederlandsch Indië. (Blume gave the name Etaeria, but Hetaeria is a conserved name.) The name Hetaeria is an Ancient Greek word meaning "comrade" or "companion".

=== Species list ===
Species recognized as of October 2025:

- Hetaeria affinis (Griff.) Seidenf. & Ormerod - Himalayas, Thailand, Vietnam, Yunnan, Bangladesh
- Hetaeria alta Ridl. - Thailand, Vietnam, Malaysia, Borneo
- Hetaeria anomala Lindl. - from Assam east to Taiwan and south to Sumatra and the Philippines
- Hetaeria armata Ormerod & H.A.Pedersen - Thailand
- Hetaeria baeuerlenii Schltr. - New Guinea
- Hetaeria callosa (J.J.Sm.) Ormerod - New Guinea, Bismarcks
- Hetaeria elata Hook.f. - Malaysia, Borneo, Philippines
- Hetaeria elegans Ridl. - Malaysia
- Hetaeria finlaysoniana Seidenf. – Sri Lanka, Myanmar, Thailand, Guangxi, Hainan
- Hetaeria goodyeroides Schltr. - New Guinea
- Hetaeria heterosepala (Rchb.f.) Summerh. - Africa from Liberia to Tanzania; also Madagascar
- Hetaeria hylophiloides (Carr) Ormerod & J.J.Wood - Sabah
- Hetaeria lamellata Blume - Java
- Hetaeria latipetala Schltr. - New Guinea
- Hetaeria linguella (Carr) J.J.Wood & Ormerod - Sarawak
- Hetaeria mannii (Rchb.f.) Benth. ex Durand & Schinz - Cameroon, Gabon, Congo-Brazzaville, Congo-Kinshasa, islands in the Gulf of Guinea
- Hetaeria obliqua Blume - Hainan, Nicobar Islands, Thailand, Borneo, Malaysia, Sumatra
- Hetaeria oblongifolia Blume - widespread from India east to Japan and Micronesia, south to Australia
- Hetaeria occidentalis Summerh. - Africa from Sierra Leone to Congo-Kinshasa
- Hetaeria pelota N.Pearce & P.J.Cribb - Bhutan
- Hetaeria rhombipetala Ormerod & J.J.Wood - Sabah
- Hetaeria rostrata J.J.Sm. - Sumatra
- Hetaeria tetraptera (Rchb.f.) Summerh. - Nigeria, Cameroon, Gabon, Congo-Kinshasa
- Hetaeria vaginalis Rchb.f. - Comoros
- Hetaeria whitmeei Rchb.f. - Fiji, New Caledonia, Samoa, Tonga
- Hetaeria youngsayei Ormerod - Thailand, Vietnam, Hainan
