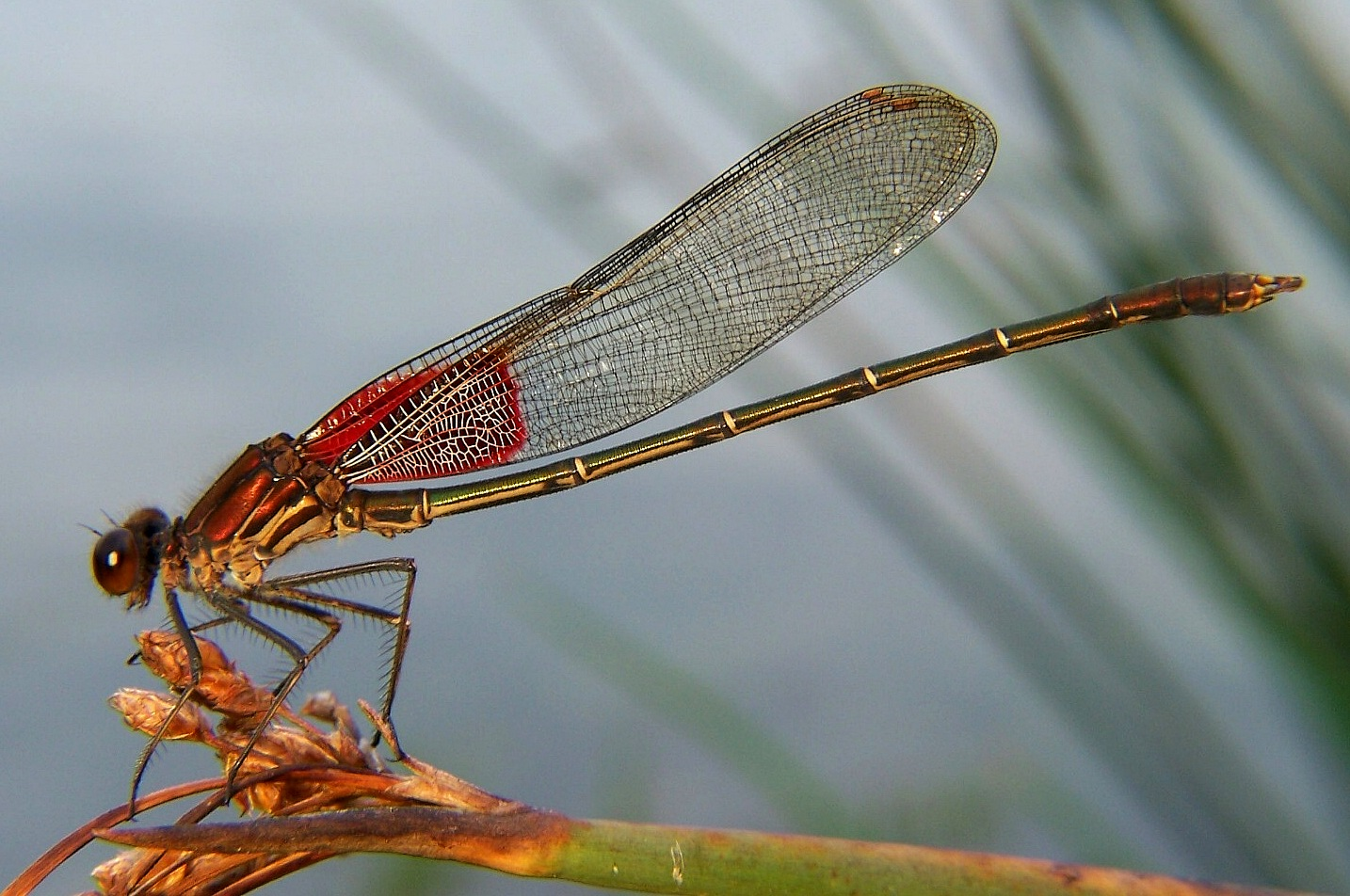
- American Rubyspot

Scientific classification
- Kingdom: Animalia
- Phylum: Arthropoda
- Clade: Pancrustacea
- Class: Insecta
- Order: Odonata
- Suborder: Zygoptera
- Family: Calopterygidae
- Subfamily: Hetaerininae
- Genus: Hetaerina; Hagen in Selys, 1853

= Hetaerina =

Genus of damselflies

Hetaerina is a genus of damselflies in the family Calopterygidae. They are commonly known as rubyspots because of the deep red wing bases of the males. The name is from Ancient Greek: ἑταίρα (hetaira), courtesan. The Guatemalan rubyspot H. rudis is considered vulnerable on the IUCN Red Data List.

== Overview ==
=== Cladistics ===
The genus Hetaerina alone encompasses roughly 40 species in a variety of habitats throughout the Americas. Recent phylogenetic analyses for the subfamily Heterininae suggest that the genera Mneserate and Ormenophlebia are actually nestled within their sister genus Hetaerina, which would account for the species confusion of early Mnesarete and Hetaerina studies.

=== Taxonomy ===
The genus currently contains the following species:

- Hetaerina amazonica Sjöstedt, 1918
- Hetaerina americana (Fabricius, 1798) – American Rubyspot
- Hetaerina auripennis (Burmeister, 1839)
- Hetaerina aurora Ris, 1918
- Hetaerina brightwelli (Kirby, 1823)
- Hetaerina caja (Drury, 1773)
- Hetaerina calverti (Vega-Sánchez et al., 2020) – cryptic rubyspot
- Hetaerina capitalis Selys, 1873
- Hetaerina charca Calvert, 1909
- Hetaerina cruentata (Rambur, 1842) Highland rubyspot
- Hetaerina curvicauda Garrison, 1990 – hook-tipped rubyspot
- Hetaerina duplex Selys, 1869
- Hetaerina erythrokalamus Garrison, 1990
- Hetaerina flavipennis Garrison, 1990
- Hetaerina fuscoguttata Selys, 1878
- Hetaerina gallardi Machet, 1989
- Hetaerina hebe Selys, 1853
- Hetaerina indeprensa Garrison, 1990
- Hetaerina infecta Calvert, 1901
- Hetaerina laesa Hagen in Selys, 1853
- Hetaerina longipes Hagen in Selys, 1853
- Hetaerina majuscula Selys, 1853
- Hetaerina medinai Rácenis, 1968
- Hetaerina mendezi Jurzitza, 1982
- Hetaerina miniata Selys, 1879
- Hetaerina moribunda Hagen in Selys, 1853
- Hetaerina mortua Hagen in Selys, 1853
- Hetaerina occisa Hagen in Selys, 1853
- Hetaerina pilula Calvert, 1901
- Hetaerina proxima Selys, 1853
- Hetaerina rosea Selys, 1853
- Hetaerina rudis Calvert, 1901 – Guatemalan rubyspot
- Hetaerina sanguinea Selys, 1853
- Hetaerina sempronia Hagen in Selys, 1853
- Hetaerina simplex Selys, 1853
- Hetaerina titia (Drury, 1773) – smoky rubyspot
- Hetaerina vulnerata Hagen in Selys, 1853 – canyon rubyspot
- Hetaerina westfalli Rácenis, 1968
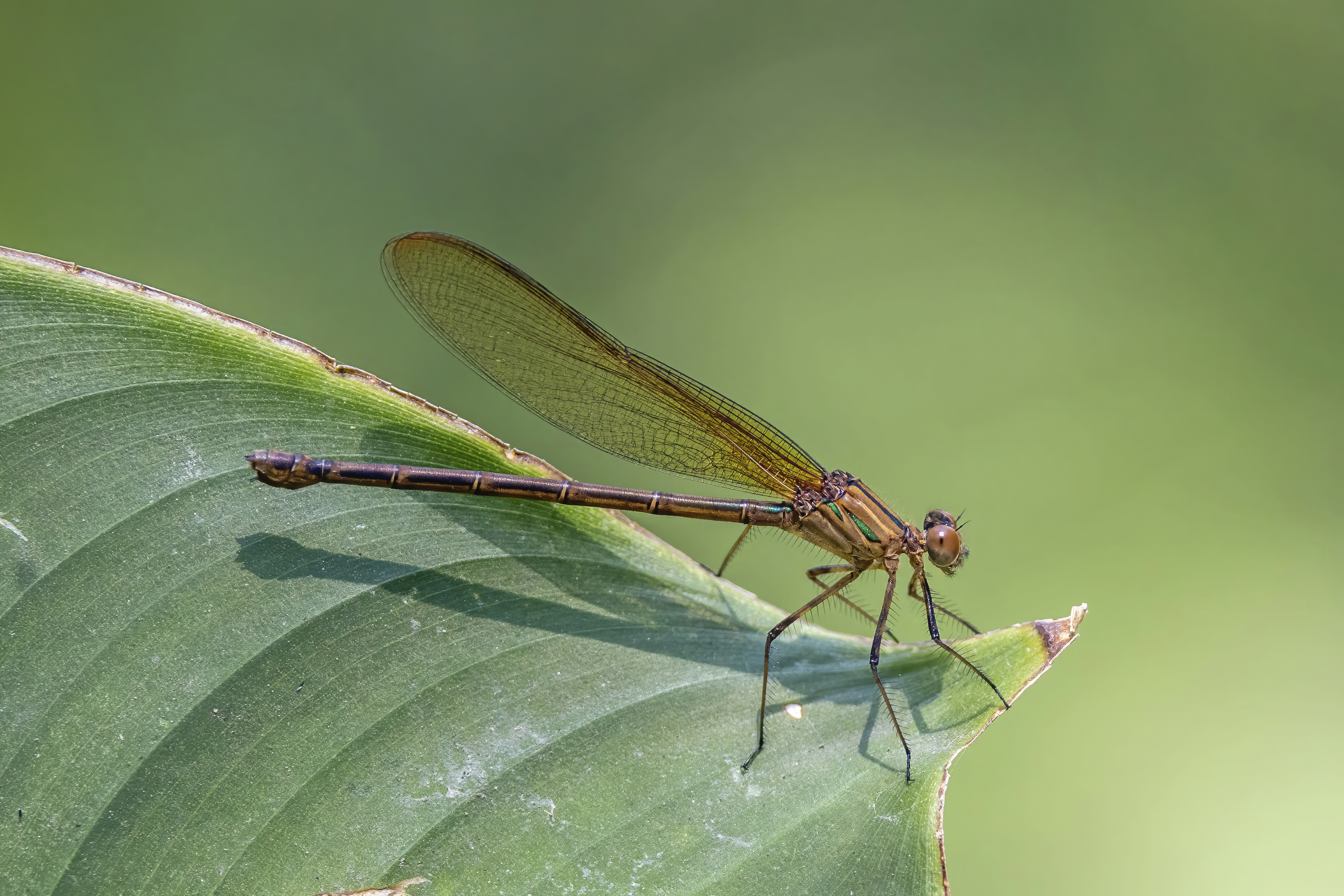
Highland rubyspot (H. cruentata) female
Guatemalan

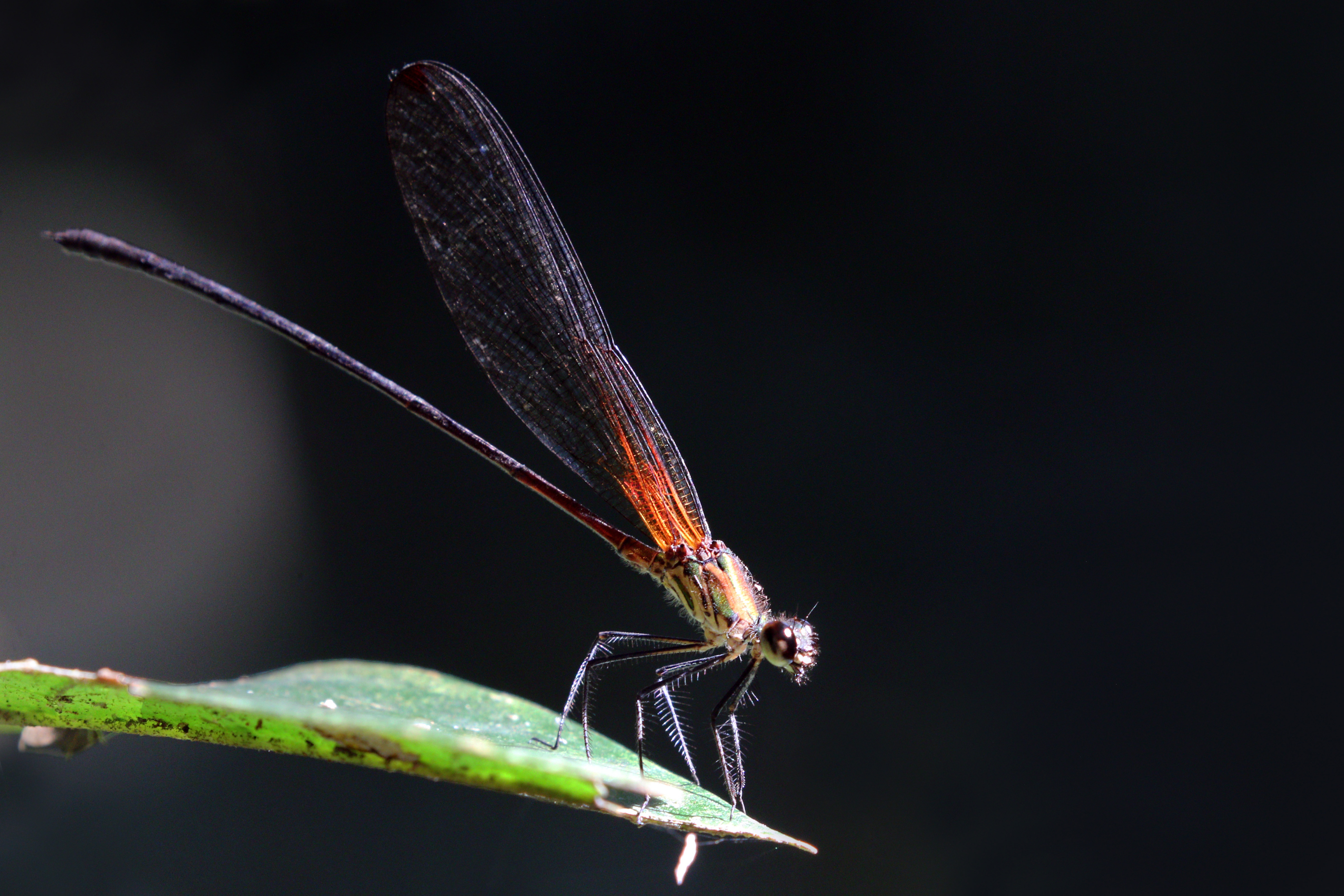
H. laesa, male
Southern Amazon, Brazil

=== Habitat ===
Hetaerinae species primarily inhabit streams and rivers, showing highest levels of diversity in the tropical regions of South America. Most species are native to tropical and subtropical regions of South and Central America, with only H. americana, H. titia, and H. vulnerata ranging further north than Mexico. Rubyspots, like all Odonates, are visual predators that prefer sunny environments for prey capture as well as social signaling.

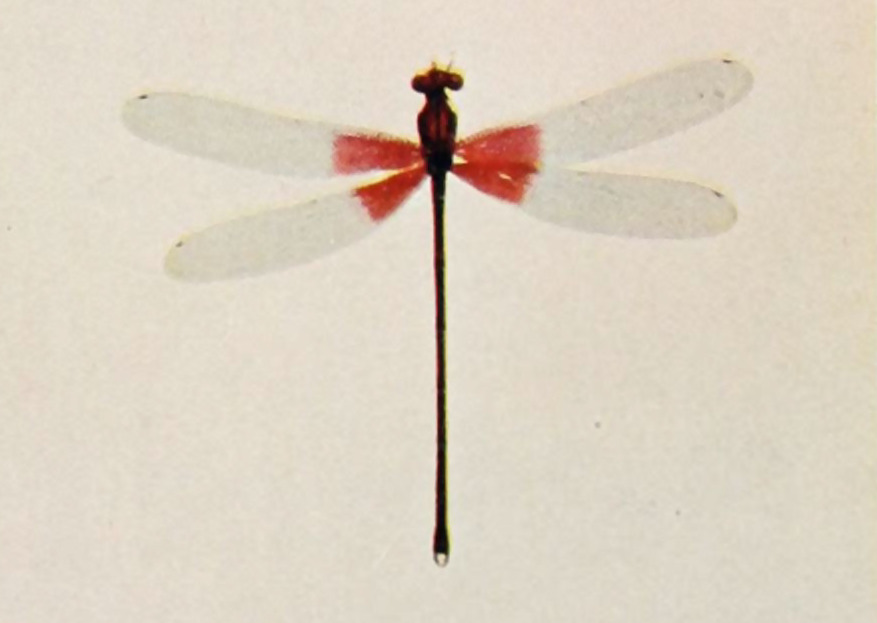
H. americana male

=== Morphology and general lifecycle ===
There are two development stages for rubyspot damselflies. The first is the larval stage, which is largely occupied by feeding until sexual maturity is reached. This is then followed by the terrestrial adult stage which is devoted entirely to reproduction. The adult stage of rubyspots has conspicuous sexual dimorphism. Hetaerina males are larger than females and have iridescent metallic bodies accompanied by their characteristic red wing spots. In general, female Hetaerinae are observed to have pale brown wings and cryptically patterned bodies, making them hard to identify for many species of the genus. As damselflies, rubyspots are generally weak fliers, and their use of both water and terrestrial habitats within their lifecycle make them important ecological indicator organisms for ecological or environmental disruptions for the areas they inhabit.

== Reproduction ==
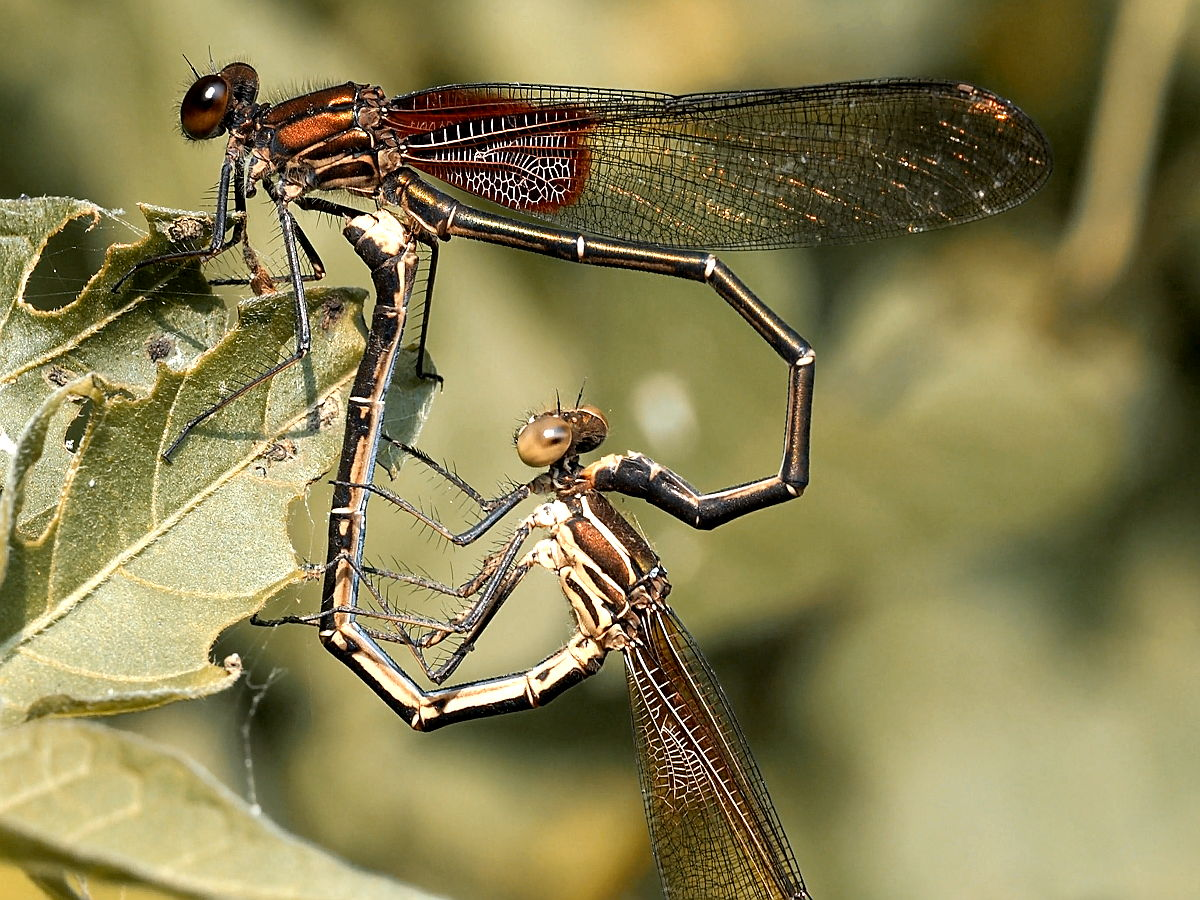
H. americana mating pair

=== General reproductive behavior and mating strategy ===
Damselflies are an important study system for sexual selection research because they exhibit a broad diversity of reproductive behaviors. Hetaerinae almost universally exhibit lek polygyny (with the exception of H. rosea which has resource-defense polygyny), which is not common amongst the Odonata order. Some researchers theorize that the lekking behavior contributes to thermoregulation needed for maintaining activity levels. Rubyspot lekking involves intense male-male competition for mating territories, often leading to both interspecific and intraspecific aggression, as well as the emergence of persistent alternative mating strategies. Once having reached sexual maturity (denoted by completed production of fat reserves and muscle content), male rubyspots move to water sites to begin competition for mating territories. Females then visit the territories, copulate with the males, and oviposit in submerged vegetation. For some species, such as the vastly distributed Hetaerina americana, male body size is considered to be the result of sexual selection via female choice and/or direct competition for access to females. For all rubyspots, there are no pre-copulatory courtship displays, and males exhibit aggressive harassment to females both before and during copulation. Male harassment begins as females arrive at the sampling site, aggressively chasing females with direct-contact assaults and can clasp onto resistant females to retain them during copulation. While female egg production decreases with the intensity of male harassment, this also results in production of larger eggs. Both males and females can mate multiply. Female rubyspots have the ability to postpone oviposition as well as store sperm in specialized storage organs, and thus males have evolved mechanisms to scoop out competing sperm before matings.

Copulation generally takes place in three stages:

- Male grasping of the female, followed by sperm transfer
- Tandem flying over other territories, which involves intense and aggressive chasing by other males (see § Alternative mating strategies below)
- Male displacement from tandem and mating begins again; or, the tandem male and female arrive at the oviposition site, with the male nearby while the female submerges unaccompanied into the water.

During oviposition, males exhibit guarding behavior in order to displace any intruding males.

=== Alternative mating strategies ===
The existence of alternative mating strategies within Hetaerinae presents another reason for their popularity among sexual and evolutionary ecological researchers. As explained above, rubyspots exhibit highly aggressive male-male competition for access to mating territories resulting in the emergence of alternative reproductive behaviors. One mating strategy is the defense of mating territories. Territorial males are larger than their alternative counterparts, and show higher correlation between wing pigmentation and fat reserves (having larger wing spots on average). Territorial males also tend to have significantly better immune ability, and generally are in better condition than nonterritorial males. Nonterritorial males, unable to garner these territories, are still significantly reproductively successful despite their lesser size and condition. These males aggressively chase after couples flying in tandem and attempt to displace the male before oviposition. In this regard, Hetaerina males have evolved at least two mechanisms for displacing rival sperm. Males of H. americana physically scoop out rival sperm from the female's storage organs, and other species may utilize female stimulation to result in release of the stored sperm.

A third mating tactic has been noted for H. americana males, wherein some individuals switch between territorial and nonterritorial tactics. Displaced territorial males are found to have fat reserves (and thus energy levels) similar to that of nonterritorial males, which significantly impacts their ability to attempt to regain territory. "Switcher" males avoid this dramatic shift by utilizing periods of both territoriality and nonterritoriality. These males are generally between the averages for territorial male condition and nonterritorial male condition, less than the former but greater than the latter. Territorial periods are always at the same territory, and these males are often as successful as the dominant mating type.

=== Wing pigmentation ===
Male wing pigmentation is a well studied trait for many damselflies, as it is sexually selected for by different mechanisms throughout the many genera of damselfly. Rubyspots utilize male-male competition to directly maintain and drive intrasexual selection on their nominal trait. As Hetaerina is considered the ancestral genus of its family, this wing pigmentation is likely an ancestral trait that has been lost four separate times between the three genera. Wing pigmentation is considered to be an indicator trait for male condition, though the trait is not directly condition-dependent. There is much variation among Hetaerina species as to its indications of body size/diet, immune ability, and survivability. It has been proven that the properties of the pigment are not themselves under selection, but the use of the phrase "wing pigmentation" is widely used among its studies to mean the trait as both pigment and size. Wing spot size appears to be correlated to success in gaining territory for most rubyspots. Increased spot size from competition has been shown to be regulated from increased predation risk and the possibility of decreased condition (if large spot size develops too early during male maturation). Studies of wing pigmentation for other Calopterygid damselflies have shown some correlation between wing pigmentation and thermoregulatory abilities, but this has yet to be tested among rubyspots.

=== Population divergence and speciation ===
Competitor recognition of male wing pigmentation has been shown to be one of the primary divergent traits between sympatric species pairs within Hetaerina. Interestingly, female mate recognition within sympatric species appears to be unaffected by dissimilarity in wing pigmentation, making the character displacement a result of interspecific competition alone. The intrasexual nature of variations in wing pigmentation contribute to the many characteristics of male rubyspots resulting from male-male competition and aggression. Wing pigmentation has been shown to decrease in sympatric species with greater interspecific fighting and increase in species with greater intraspecific fighting, a sign of character displacement due to intrasexual aggression among many species of Hetaerina. This character displacement contributes to the more general trend of morph dissimilarity between populations with increased interspecific aggression where the species with higher population density drives the displacement of wing pigmentation for the less dominant species, a phenomenon known as "agonistic character displacement". For sympatric rubyspot species, it has been seen that one or both populations will evolve divergent pigmentation so that the pattern or amount of pigment is less similar between them.

Markedly high levels of reproductive interference exist between some species of rubyspot, resulting in decreased fitness for the species involved due to wasted resources in unsuccessful matings. Reproductive interference increases for sympatric species pairs, due likely to the similarity of female morphs. For those in sympatry with H. americana, this is accompanied by considerably low genetic flow between sympatric populations and thus indicates reproductive isolation. While the mechanisms of this isolation are yet to be fully determined, the genetic differentiation between certain populations points to the possibility of H. americana being a complex of cryptic species. This theory is supported by a recently discovered species, H. calverti, that is reproductively isolated from H. americana but shows very little interspecific trait variation otherwise.

== Bibliography ==
- Álvarez, H.; Serrano-Meneses, M.; Reyes-Márquez, I.; Jiménez-Cortés, J.; Córdoba-Aguilar, A. (2013). "Allometry of a sexual trait in relation to diet experience and alternative mating tactics in two rubyspot damselflies (Calopterygidae: Hetaerina)". Biological Journal of the Linnean Society. 108 (3): 521–533. doi:10.1111/j.1095-8312.2012.02031.x.
- Anderson, C. N.; Grether, G. F. (2010). "Character displacement in the fighting colours of Hetaerina damselflies". Proceedings of the Royal Society B: Biological Sciences. 277 (1700): 3669–3675. Bibcode:2010PBioS.277.3669A. doi:10.1098/rspb.2010.0935. PMC 2982247. PMID 20591870.
- Anderson, C.; Grether, G. (1 May 2011). "Multiple routes to reduced interspecific territorial fighting in Hetaerina damselflies". Behavioral Ecology. 22 (3): 527–534. doi:10.1093/beheco/arr013.
- Bick, G.; Sulzbach, D. (1966). "Reproductive behaviour of the damselfly, Hetaerina americana (Fabricius) (Odonata: Calopterygidae)". Animal Behaviour. 14 (1): 156–158. Bibcode:1966AnBeh..14..156B. doi:10.1016/S0003-3472(66)80024-6. PMID 5918240.
- Contreras-Garduño, J.; Buzatto, A.; Abundis, L.; Nájera-Cordero, K.; Córdoba-Aguilar, A. (2007). "Wing Colour Properties Do Not Reflect Male Condition in the American Rubyspot (Hetaerina americana)". Ethology. 113 (10): 944–952. Bibcode:2007Ethol.113..944C. doi:10.1111/j.1439-0310.2007.01402.x.
- Contreras-Garduño, J.; Lanz-Mendoza, H.; Córdoba-Aguilar, A. (2007). "The expression of a sexually selected trait correlates with different immune defense components and survival in males of the American rubyspot". Journal of Insect Physiology. 53 (6): 612–621. Bibcode:2007JInsP..53..612C. doi:10.1016/j.jinsphys.2007.03.003. PMID 17451742.
- Córdoba-Aguilar, Alex; González-Tokman, Daniel M.; Naguib, M.; Barrett, L.; Brockmann, H. J.; Healy, S. (2014). "Chapter Seven – The Behavioral and Physiological Ecology of Adult Rubyspot Damselflies (Hetaerina, Calopterygidae, Odonata)". Advances in the Study of Behavior. Vol. 46. Academic Press. pp. 311–341.
- Córdoba-Aguilar; Raihani; Serrano-Meneses; Contreras-Garduño (2009). "The lek mating system of Hetaerina damselflies (Insecta: Calopterygidae)". Behaviour. 146 (2): 189–207. Bibcode:2009Behav.146..189C. doi:10.1163/156853909X410739.
- Córdoba-Aguilar, A.; Rocha-Ortega, M. (30 May 2019). "Damselfly (Odonata: Calopterygidae) Population Decline in an Urbanizing Watershed". Journal of Insect Science. 19 (3) 30: 1–6. doi:10.1093/jisesa/iez063. PMC 6599065. PMID 31253984.
- Drury, J.; Okamoto, K.; Anderson, C.; Grether, G. (2015). "Reproductive interference explains persistence of aggression between species". Proceedings of the Royal Society B: Biological Sciences. 282 (1804) 20142256. Bibcode:2015PBioS.28242256D. doi:10.1098/rspb.2014.2256. PMC 4375855. PMID 25740887.
- Johnson, C. (1973). "Distributional Patterns and Their Interpretation in Hetaerina (Odonata: Calopterygidae". The Florida Entomologist. 56 (1): 24–42. doi:10.2307/3493658. JSTOR 3493658.
- Gabela-Flores, Maria; Sanmartín-Villar, Iago; Rivas Torres, Anais; Encalada, Andrea; Cordero-Rivera, Adolfo (2019). "Demography and territorial behavior of three species of the genus Hetaerina along three tropical stream ecosystems (Odonata: Calopterygidae)". Odonatologica. 48: 79–100.
- Garrison, R. W. (1990). "A Synopsis of the Genus Hetaerina with Descriptions of Four New Species (Odonata: Calopterygidae)". Transactions of the American Entomological Society. 116 (1): 175–259.
- Grether, G. (1996). "Intrasexual Competition Alone Favors a Sexually Dimorphic Ornament in the Rubyspot Damselfly Hetaerina americana". Evolution. 50 (5): 1949–1957. doi:10.2307/2410753. JSTOR 2410753. PMID 28565578.
- Grether, G. (1996). "Sexual Selection and Survival Selection on Wing Coloration and Body Size in the Rubyspot Damselfly Hetaerina americana". Evolution. 50 (5): 1939–1948. doi:10.2307/2410752. JSTOR 2410752. PMID 28565587.
- Grether, G.; Losin, N.; Anderson, C.; Okamoto, K. (2009). "The role of interspecific interference competition in character displacement and the evolution of competitor recognition". Biological Reviews. 84 (4): 617–635. doi:10.1111/j.1469-185X.2009.00089.x. PMID 19681844.
- González-Tokman; Córdoba-Aguilar; Lanz-Mendoza; González-Santoyo (2010). "Phenoloxidase activity and melanization do not always covary with sexual trait expression in Hetaerina damselflies (Insecta: Calopterygidae)". Behaviour. 147 (10): 1285–1307. Bibcode:2010Behav.147.1285G. doi:10.1163/000579510X516777.
- Guillermo-Ferreira, R.; Del-Claro, K. (1 January 2011). "Resource Defense Polygyny by Hetaerina rosea Selys (Odonata: Calopterygidae): Influence of Age and Wing Pigmentation". Neotropical Entomology. 40 (1): 78–84. Bibcode:2011NeEnt..40...78G. doi:10.1590/S1519-566X2011000100011. PMID 21437486.
- Henry, E.; Rivera, J.; Linkem, C.; Scales, J.; Butler, M. (January 2018). "Damselflies that prefer dark habitats illustrate the importance of light as an ecological resource". Biological Journal of the Linnean Society. 123 (1): 144–154. doi:10.1093/biolinnean/blx122.
- Serrano-Meneses, M. A.; Córdoba-Aguilar, A.; Méndez, V.; Layen, S. J.; Székely, T. (2007). "Sexual size dimorphism in the American rubyspot: male body size predicts male competition and mating success". Animal Behaviour. 73 (6): 987–997. Bibcode:2007AnBeh..73..987S. doi:10.1016/j.anbehav.2006.08.012.
- Raihani, G.; Serrano-Meneses, M. A.; Córdoba-Aguilar, A. (2008). "Male mating tactics in the American rubyspot damselfly: territoriality, nonterritoriality and switching behaviour". Animal Behaviour. 75 (6): 1851–1860. Bibcode:2008AnBeh..75.1851R. doi:10.1016/j.anbehav.2007.11.002.
- Standring, Samantha; Sánchez-Herrera, Melissa; Guillermo-Ferreira, Rhainer; Ware, Jessica L.; Vega-Sánchez, Yesenia Margarita; Clement, Rebecca; Drury, Jonathan P.; Grether, Gregory F.; González-Rodríguez, Antonio; Mendoza-Cuenca, Luis; Bota-Sierra, Cornelio A.; Bybee, Seth (2022). "Evolution and Biogeographic History of Rubyspot Damselflies (Hetaerininae: Calopterygidae: Odonata)". Diversity. 14 (9): 757. Bibcode:2022Diver..14..757S. doi:10.3390/d14090757.
- Svensson, E.; Waller, J. (2013). "Ecology and Sexual Selection: Evolution of Wing Pigmentation in Calopterygid Damselflies in Relation to Latitude, Sexual Dimorphism, and Speciation". The American Naturalist. 182 (5): E174–E195. Bibcode:2013ANat..182E.174S. doi:10.1086/673206. PMID 24107378.
- Vega-Sánchez, Y.; Mendoza-Cuenca, L.; González-Rodríguez, A. (2019). "Complex evolutionary history of the American Rubyspot damselfly, Hetaerina americana (Odonata): Evidence of cryptic speciation". Molecular Phylogenetics and Evolution. 139 106536. Bibcode:2019MolPE.13906536V. doi:10.1016/j.ympev.2019.106536. PMID 31212083.
- Vega-Sánchez, Y.; Mendoza-Cuenca, L.; González-Rodríguez, A. (2020). "Hetaerina calverti (Odonata: Zygoptera: Calopterygidae) sp. nov., a new cryptic species of the American Rubyspot complex". Zootaxa. 4766 (3): 485–497. doi:10.11646/zootaxa.4766.3.7. PMID 33056594.
- Vega-Sánchez, Y. M.; Mendoza-Cuenca, L.; González-Rodríguez, A. (2022). "Morphological variation and reproductive isolation in the Hetaerina americana species complex". Scientific Reports. 12 (10888): 10888. Bibcode:2022NatSR..1210888V. doi:10.1038/s41598-022-14866-8. PMC 9240019. PMID 35764791.
