= Acilius =

Acilius may refer to:

- The family name of any ancient Roman man of the gens Acilia (see for list)
- A genus of diving beetles (see Acilius (genus)), including:
  - Acilius sulcatus
  - Acilius duvergeri
