= A. fraternus =

A. fraternus may refer to:

- Abacetus fraternus, a ground beetle
- Acilius fraternus, a predaceous diving beetle found in North America
- Archips fraternus, a synonym of Archips fraterna, a moth found in Pakistan, Java, and Borneo
