= Sexual coercion among animals =

Sexual coercion among non-human animals

Sexual coercion has been observed in many clades of animals, including mammals, birds, insects, and fish. It includes the use of violence, threats, harassment, and other tactics. Such behavior has been compared to sexual assault, including rape, among humans.

In nature, females and males usually differ in reproductive fitness optima. Males generally prefer to maximize their number of offspring, and therefore their number of mates; females, on the other hand, tend to care more for their offspring and have fewer mates. Because of this, there are generally more males available to mate at a given time, making females a limited resource. This leads males to evolve aggressive mating behaviors which can help them acquire mates.

While sexual coercion does help increase male fitness, it is very often costly to females. Sexual coercion has been observed to have consequences, such as intersexual coevolution, speciation, and sexual dimorphism.

== Male adaptations ==
=== Harassment/aggression ===
Harassment is a technique used by males of many species to force females to submit to mating. It has been observed in numerous species, including mammals, birds, insects and fish. Aggression and harassment have been documented in the males of guppies (Poecilia reticulata), bottlenose dolphins (Tursiops aduncus), botos (Inia geoffrensis), dusky dolphins (Lagenorhynchus obscurus), Hector's dolphins (Cephalorhynchus hectori), grizzly bears, polar bears, and ungulates. It is also seen in Chinook salmon (Oncorhynchus tshawytscha), red-spotted newts (Notophthalmus viridescens), and seed-eating true bugs (Neacoryphus spp.). Furthermore, it is prevalent in spider monkeys, wild Barbary macaques (Macaca sylvanus) and many other primates.

In basically all major primate taxa, aggression is used by the dominant males when herding females and keeping them away from other males. In hamadryas baboons, the males often bite the females' necks and threaten them. Wild chimpanzees can charge at females, shake branches, hit, slap, kick, pound, drag, and bite them. Orangutans are among the most forceful of mammals. Bornean orangutans (Pongo pygmaeus) exhibited aggression in almost 90 percent of their copulations, including when the females were not resisting. A possible explanation for aggressive behaviors in primates is that it is a way for males to train females to be afraid of them and be more likely to surrender to future sexual advances.

=== Intimidation ===
Males may also use more indirect techniques to mate with females, such as intimidation. While most female water striders (Gerridae) have their genitalia exposed, females of the water strider species Gerris gracilicornis have evolved a shield over their genitals. As a result, males cannot physically coerce females because mating is difficult unless the female exposes her genitalia. Therefore, males intimidate females into mating by attracting predators; they tap on the water's surface and create ripples that catch the attention of predatory fish. From there, it is in the best interest of the female to mate, and as quickly as possible, to avoid being eaten by predators. Typical mating positions of water striders have the females on the bottom, closer to predators, so the risk of predation is much higher for them. Females succumb to copulation to get males to cease signaling to predators.

Another indirect form of sexual coercion occurs in red-sided garter snakes, Thamnophis sirtalis parietalis. When males "court" females, they line their bodies up to the females' and produce caudocephalic waves, which are a series of muscle contractions that travel through their bodies from tail to head. The exact reason for this behavior is unknown, but some studies show that it relates to stress. Females have nonrespiratory air sacs containing anoxic air, and the waving pushes this air into her lungs. The resulting stress causes her cloaca to open, and aids the male in inserting his hemipenis. The stronger and more frequent the caudocephalic waves and the closer the male's cloaca to the female's, the more likely the male is to mate successfully.

=== Grasping and grappling ===
Males of certain species have evolved mating behaviors in which they forcefully attempt to mate with and inseminate females, often employing grasping techniques. These male grasping devices exist to increase the duration of copulation and restrict females from mating with other males. They are in some ways a form of mate guarding. While some males have evolved different types of modifications to aid in grasping, others just grab females and attempt to force copulation.

One type of grasping modification is spiky male genitalia. In seed beetles (Coleoptera: Bruchidae), males possess sclerotized spines on their genitalia. These spines are used during copulation to help overcome female resistance and penetrate into their copulatory duct. In addition to aiding penetration, these spines promote the passage of seminal fluids, and act as an anchor to keep the female from fleeing. Furthermore, spiny genitals can injure the females and make them less likely to remate. Sepsidae fly males have modifications on their forelegs to help them grasp onto female wing bases. These modifications include cuticular outgrowths, indentations, and bristles, and males use them to secure themselves onto females after jumping on them. Once the males grab on, a struggle ensues akin to a rodeo, where males try to hold on while females violently shake them off.

Another type of modification is found in male diving beetles (of the family Dytiscidae), who are equipped with suction cup structures on their front legs. They use these to grab passing females and attach to their dorsal surfaces. To get the females to submit, males shake the females violently and keep them submerged underwater (diving beetles cannot go long without atmospheric oxygen). Unable to get air, female diving beetles submit to the male's advances in order to avoid drowning (and they lose the energy to resist). Once the males attach, copulation can occur.

Male waterfowl have developed another modification; while most male birds have no external genitalia, male waterfowl (Aves: Anatidae) have a phallus (length 1.5–4.0 centimetres [0.59–1.57 in]). Most birds mate with the males balancing on top of the females and touching cloacas in a “cloacal kiss”; this makes forceful insemination very difficult. The phallus that male waterfowl have evolved everts out of their bodies (in a clockwise coil) and aids in inseminating females without their cooperation.

Another such technique is having a "lock-like" mechanism, found in Drosophila montana, dogs, wolves, and pigs. Towards the end of copulation, females struggle to try to dislodge the males, whose genital organs take much longer to deflate than females do; the locking (most commonly known in canids as a "tie") allows the males to copulate for as long as they need to until they are finished. In dogs, the male has a knot in his penis that gets engorged with blood and ties the female, locking them together during copulation, until the act is complete. Male dogs have evolved this mechanism during mating in order to prevent other males from penetration whilst they are and the use of the tie enables them to be more likely to inseminate the female and produce a healthy litter of pups. Breaking this "tie" can be physically harmful to both females and males.

Males of many species simply grab the females and force a mating. Coercive mating is very common in water striders (Gerridae) because in most of the species, the female genitalia are often exposed and easily accessible to males. Without any courtship behavior, males initiate by forcefully trying to mount the females. Carrying the males on their backs is energetically costly to females, so they try to resist and throw off the males. The males fight back even harder and use their forelegs to tightly grasp the female's thorax and keep them from escaping. The males then forcefully insert their genitalia into the female vulvar opening. In the newt species Notophthalmus viridescens, males carry out a courtship behavior called amplexus. It consists of males capturing females that do not want to mate with them and using their hind limbs to grasp the females by their pectoral regions.

Male guppies (Poecilia reticulata) have been observed to forcefully copulate with females by trying to insert their gonopodium (male sex organ) into female's genital pores, whether or not they are accepting. Sometimes, male guppies also try to forcefully mate with Skiffia bilineata (goodeid) females, which resemble guppy females and tend to share the same habitat, even when guppy females are available. A possible explanation for this is the deeper genital cavity of S. bilineata, which stimulates the males more than when mating with guppy females.

Males of some species are able to immobilize females and force copulation. In pigs and boars, males grab females and maneuver the pelvis to lift the vaginal opening and facilitate copulation. The stimulation following intromission causes the female to be immobilized. The male can then freely continue copulation without worrying about the female escaping. Immobilization of the female also occurs in muscovy ducks.

Grasping and/or grappling mating situations have also been documented in Calopteryx haemorrhoidalis haemorrhoidalis (Odonata), fallow deer (Dama dama), wild orangutans (Smuts 1993), wild chimpanzees, water voles (semi-aquatic rats) Arvicola amphibius, feral fowl, mallard (Anas platyrhynchos), hamadryas baboons and many other primates, coho salmon (Oncorhynchus kisutch), and others.

=== Infanticide ===
In some mammal species, it is common for males to commit infanticide to mate with females. This happens often in species that live in groups, such as Old and New World monkeys, apes, prosimians, and hamadryas baboons. There is usually a single breeding male in a group, and when an outside male aggressively takes over, he kills off all of the young offspring. The males kill infants that are not their own to assert their strength and position, and mate with the females. Killing infants may also bring breastfeeding females out of lactational amenorrhea and back into fecundity, improving the male’s chance of fertilising the female if he returns to mate with her again soon. Sometimes, multiple males will invade a troop and gang up on females, killing their offspring and subsequently mating with them. This occurs in spider monkeys, red-backed squirrel monkeys, chimpanzees, and red howlers.

=== Secretions ===
In the newt species Notophthalmus viridescens, the males rub off hormonal secretions onto the skin of the females they are courting. These hormones have been shown to make the female more receptive to mating with the male. When the male deposits the secretions, he detaches from the female and releases a spermatophore (containing spermatozoa). It is then the female's decision to either accept it and pick it up or reject it by running away; these hormones make her more likely to accept it.

=== Coercive faithfulness ===
==== Post-copulatory guarding ====
Another form of coercion is male mate guarding, used to keep females from mating with other males, and often involves aggression. Guarding allows the males to ensure their paternity. A classic example occurs in diving beetles, family Dytiscidae. After copulation, males continue to guard females for up to six hours. They hold them underwater, occasionally tilting them up for air. Guarding also occurs in water striders where, once males complete their sperm transfer, they often remain on top of the females. This guarding duration varies, lasting from several minutes to several weeks. The purpose of such long guarding periods is for the males to see the females lay their eggs and be assured that the offspring are theirs. This behavior also occurs in hamadryas baboons (Papio hamadryas), where the leader males practice intensive mate guarding. In Drosophila montana, studies have shown that following mate guarding, the chances of a female mating with or being inseminated by another male were greatly diminished. This shows that the mate guarding tactic can be very effective.

==== Secretions/ejaculations ====
Males of some species use bodily fluids, such as seminal fluid from their ejaculate, to aid in the coercion of females. Seminal fluid in males of Drosophila melanogaster may contain chemicals that increase the amount of time it takes for females to remate, decrease the length of successive matings, or keep her from remating at all. The less a female mates with other males after copulation with a male, the more likely it is for him to ensure his paternity. These chemicals may also serve to increase the female's reproductive success, but at the cost of decreased longevity and immune response.

In many species, seminal fluid can be used as a sort of mating plug. Males of these species transfer their sperm at the beginning of copulation and use the rest of copulation to transfer substances that help build up the mating plugs. These plugs are effective in ensuring that the female does not mate with any other males and that the male's paternity is secured.

== Costs to females ==
=== Direct ===
A major direct cost of sexual coercion is physical injury. Male seed beetles (Coleoptera: Bruchidae) have sclerotized spines on their genitalia, which penetrate the female and leave melanized scars. Females can be physically injured from just one mating, and the more a female mates, the more scarring forms in the copulatory duct. In guppies, the male's gonopodium can cause damage when forcefully inserted, causing cloacal damage to the females. In fowl, females can be physically injured during forceful copulations. Also, semen transferred from the males can contain pathogens and fecal matter, which can lead to disease and decrease female fitness. In elephant seals, physical injury happens very often. In fact, mating leads to 1 in every 1,000 female elephant seals getting killed. Other species in which the females (and/or their offspring) are injured or even killed include lions, rodents, farm cats, crabeater seals, grey seals, sea lions, bottle-nosed dolphins (Tursiops truncatus), red-sided garter snakes (Thamnophis sirtalis parietalis), and newts (N. viridescens).

Another cost is the excess energy and time expenditure that comes with mating. For example, female water striders, Gerridae, and marine snails of the genus Littorina have to carry the males on their backs while they mate. First of all, this is a great loss of energy. Second, both the male and the female are at a much greater risk of predation in this position. Furthermore, the time spent mating interferes with the time that could have been spent foraging and feeding.

In addition, sexual coercion can lower body condition and immunity in ways other than physical damage. Harassment can lead to stress, which can result in weight loss, decreased immune function and energy stores, and less feeding, which has been seen in red-spotted newts. Furthermore, when females are constantly moving around to avoid violent males, they are not able to form female social ties (for example, Grévy's zebra/Equus grevyi). This also happens in species where herding males sometimes do not permit females to join their family in different groups, like in hamadryad baboons.

=== Indirect ===
Indirect costs are those that affect females in the future. One such cost happens because sexual coercion does not allow females to choose the males they want to mate with, which are usually males that are higher quality, compatible, and/or have good genes that will increase their offspring's survival and fitness. Coercion decreases this choice and can lead to their offspring having lower genetic quality. Studies of the rose bitterling (Rhodeus ocellatus), have shown that offspring of females with mate choice had higher survival rates than offspring of females that did not. Another ultimate cost comes from when males commit infanticide to obtain mating access. This loss of offspring leads to a decrease in fitness of females.

== Female counter-adaptations ==
=== Anatomical protection ===
As a response to sexual coercion and the costs that females face, one of their counter-adaptations is the evolution of anatomical protection. Females of some species, such as the water striders, developed morphological shields to protect their genitalia from males that want to forcefully copulate. Some Gerridae females have also evolved abdominal spines and altered the shapes of their abdomens to make them less accessible to males.

Waterfowl males of the family Aves: Anatidae have evolved a phallus to aid in coercion. This phallus everts out of the male body (when it's time to mate) in a counter-clockwise coil. As a response, females have developed vaginal structures called dead end sacs and clockwise coils to protect themselves from forceful intromission. Waterfowl females have evolved these “convoluted vaginal morphologies” to make it harder for males to insert themselves without the female's consent.

=== Male avoidance/habitat change ===
Another female tactic to counter coercion is to try to avoid males that may cause them harm. To do this, females often change their habitats to get away from aggressive males, as is seen in wild Trinidadian guppies (Poecilia reticulata). Female bottlenose dolphins behave in similar ways by moving into shallow waters where there are not too many males. Other species that practice mate avoidance are Calopteryx haemorrhoidalis, a species of damselfly, who often try to hide from large groups of males to avoid harassment.

Females of the marine intertidal periwinkle species (genus Littorina) have another way to avoid males. Males usually recognize female snails by cues in their mucous trails. However, females try to mask their sex by altering these cues. In damselflies, females also try to mask their gender by mimicking male colors, which make them less attractive to males.

=== Protection/alliances ===
An effective female strategy is the employment of protection and alliances. Some females, such as wild Trinidadian guppies (Poecilia reticulate) associate themselves with protective males who come to their rescue. This also occurs in hamadryas, savanna, and olive baboons, where males and females form friendships where the female gets male protection. In northern elephant seals, the females give loud cries when mounted by undesirable or subordinate males, which attract dominant males to help. A similar phenomenon occurs in elephants, bighorn sheep, and fallow deer, where the females stay close to dominant males for protection.

Females can also form alliances with other females for protection against aggressive males. Researchers have observed such alliances in many other female-bonded species, including other Old World monkeys such as macaques, olive baboons, patas and rhesus monkeys, and gray langurs; New World monkeys such as the capuchin; and prosimians such as the ring-tailed lemur. In African vervet monkeys, related females often form groups and “gang up” on males. Females of high rank create networks of female alliances; together, they fight away persistent suitors.

=== Resistance/fighting back ===
Resisting males and fighting back are important tactics some species use to counter male coercion. Many females try to vigorously shake off males to dislodge them and flee; this is seen in female sepsid flies and diving beetles. Sepsids also try to bend their abdomen in such a way that males cannot copulate forcefully. Females are especially likely to fight back when they are protecting their offspring. This is seen in mountain gorillas, red howlers, and grey langur females, where males are often infanticidal.

Female resistance has rarely been found to be effective. Male mammals and birds are usually larger than females, and the sheer size and strength difference makes this very difficult. However, it has been observed in some species, such as squirrel monkeys, patas monkeys, vervets, and captive chimpanzees, that females can “gang up” on males when they are being aggressive. They will even try to protect a female in distress. Females have even been observed to kill immigrant males in wild red colobus monkeys.

=== Acceptance/submission ===
Sometimes, females choose not to struggle and simply acquiesce to forceful matings. This can happen when they decide that the cost of resisting would be greater than the cost of mating. They use submission to avoid further harassment or aggression, which could end in death or injury. This is often seen in primate species, such as chimpanzees and hamadryas baboons.

== Possible benefits ==
Some possible benefits of sexual coercion for the species have been hypothesized.

=== Proximate ===
A possible proximate benefit for females is that sometimes after a male mates with a female, he becomes her mate. Then, he would defend and protect her. This is seen in many primate species.

=== Ultimate ===
A possible benefit of sexual coercion that would come out in the long run is the “good genes” hypothesis. If males can overcome a female's resistance, then they must possess good genes that would increase the survival or mating success of male offspring. The hypothesis is that females can use the sexual coercion process to assess the quality of a male.

== Consequences ==
=== Coevolutionary arms race ===
Sexual coercion often leads to an intersexual coevolutionary arms race. This consists of females evolving adaptations to male advances and males evolving counter-adaptations as a response. Males persist in violent behavior, which favors the evolution of female resistance to defend themselves. In organisms where males have genitalia harmful to females, such as in certain insects, females tend to evolve thicker, less sensitive copulatory tracts. Also, they may evolve a shield over their genital openings to prevent intromission. Females of some species of water striders have evolved protection from forceful insemination, such as abdominal spines and downward-bent abdomens to make it harder for males to mate. In response, however, males have counter evolved, also changing the shape of their abdomens to those that would facilitate forceful mating.

The male waterfowl (Aves: Anatidae) evolution of a phallus to forcefully copulate with females has led to counteradaptations in females in the form of vaginal structures called dead end sacs and clockwise coils. These structures make it harder for males to achieve intromission. The clockwise coils are significant because the male phallus everts out of their body in a counter-clockwise spiral; therefore, a clockwise vaginal structure would impede forceful copulation. Studies have shown that, the longer a male's phallus, the more elaborate the corresponding vaginal structures.

It has been suggested that traumatic insemination, as seen particularly in the genus Cimex, evolved as a response to the mating plug strategy, literally routing around the mating plug through the male penetrating the abdomen of the female with his aedeagus.

=== Speciation ===
Speciation has been observed to be a possible consequence of sexual coercion. In diving beetle species family Dytiscidae, an intersexual arms race occurs between males and females. Males have evolved suction cup structures on their forelegs to help grasp females; females have counter-evolved setose dorsal furrows to impede forceful copulation. This continuous evolution (in both the forward and reverse directions) has led to the recent speciation of A. japonicus and A. kishii, where females of A. kishii have lost their dorsal furrows while those of A. japonicus have not.

=== Sexual dimorphism ===
Sexual coercion can lead to sexual dimorphisms, in which males and females have significant morphological differences. For example, in some species, larger males are more successful in forcefully mating/insemination, leading to a higher fitness. In red-sided garter snakes, Thamnophis sirtalis parietalis, it has been shown that heavier-bodied males were better courters and their size gave them an advantage over smaller bodied snakes. This helps lead to an evolution of sexual dimorphism, with males larger than females. In other species, males that are smaller than females have higher fitness. As such, many sex-specific morphological adaptations (for example, in Dytiscidae diving beetles, females have setose dorsal furrows that males do not and males have suction cups on their forelegs that females do not) are sexual dimorphisms caused by sexual coercion.
