= Acilius athabascae =

Scientific classification
- Domain: Eukaryota
- Kingdom: Animalia
- Phylum: Arthropoda
- Class: Insecta
- Order: Coleoptera
- Suborder: Adephaga
- Family: Dytiscidae
- Genus: Acilius
- Species: A. athabascae

Binomial name
- Acilius athabascae Larson, 1975

Species of beetle

Acilius athabascae is a species of predaceous diving beetle in the family Dytiscidae. It is found in North America.
