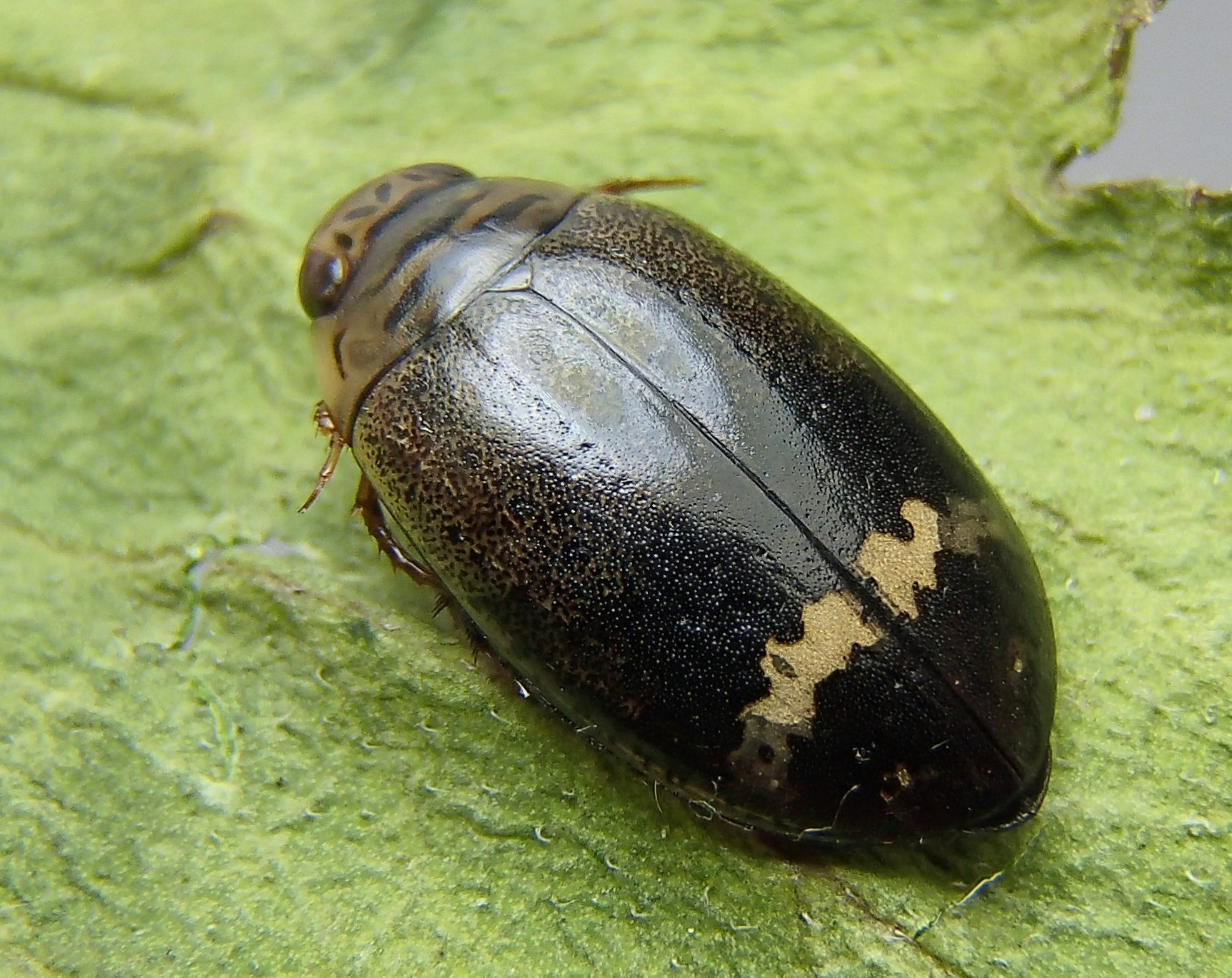

Scientific classification
- Kingdom: Animalia
- Phylum: Arthropoda
- Clade: Pancrustacea
- Class: Insecta
- Order: Coleoptera
- Suborder: Adephaga
- Family: Dytiscidae
- Genus: Acilius
- Species: A. mediatus

Binomial name
- Acilius mediatus (Say, 1823)

= Acilius mediatus =

Species of beetle

Acilius mediatus is a species of predaceous diving beetle in the family Dytiscidae. It is found in North America.

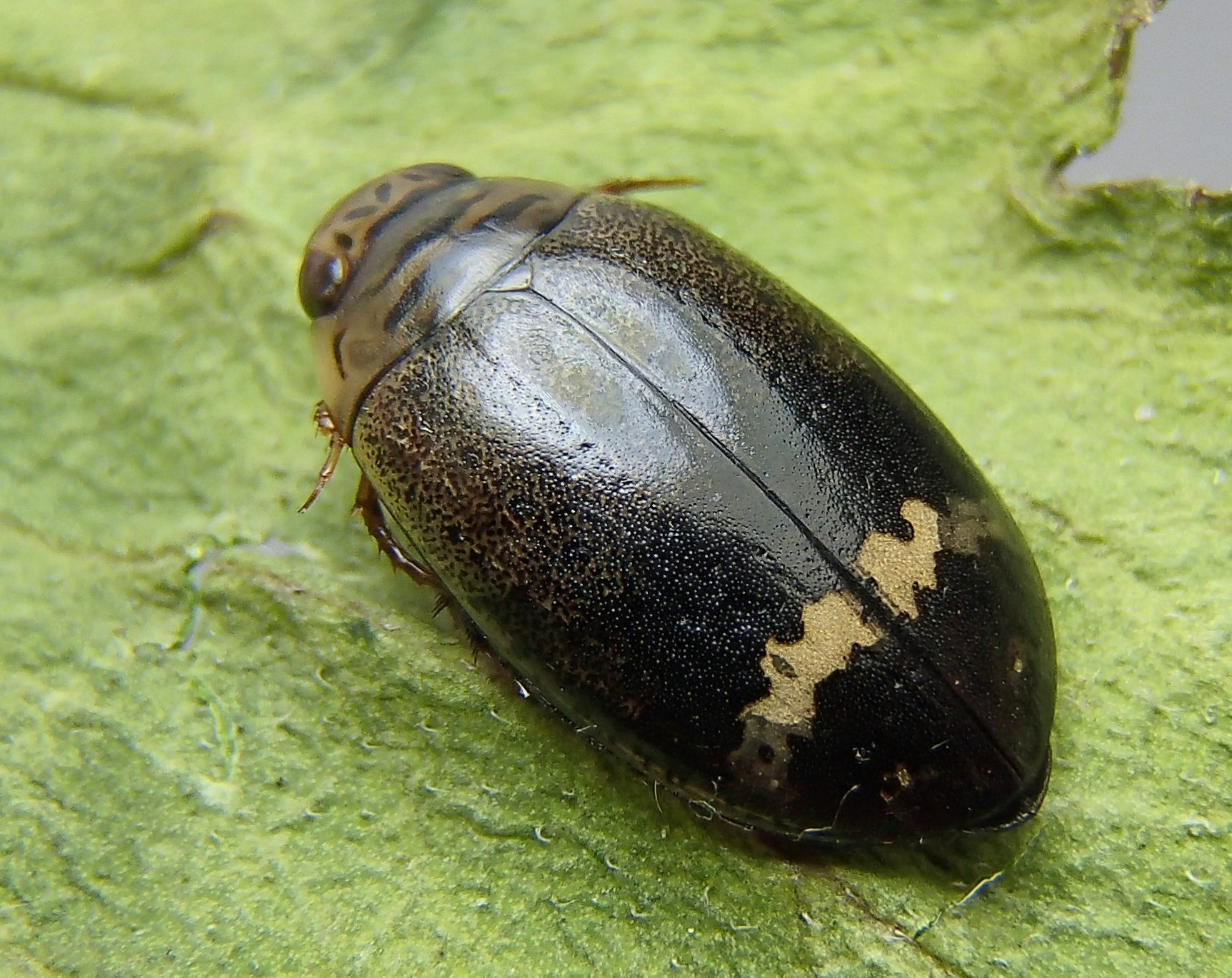

This species lives in creeks, ponds and ditches, occasionally with silt-laden streams, and are best seen during spring and summer. Prey is composed of other aquatic arthropods they can tackle. Males have expanded front feet with clumps of hairs used to grab hold of a female for mating.
