= Acilius confusus =

Scientific classification
- Domain: Eukaryota
- Kingdom: Animalia
- Phylum: Arthropoda
- Class: Insecta
- Order: Coleoptera
- Suborder: Adephaga
- Family: Dytiscidae
- Genus: Acilius
- Species: A. confusus

Binomial name
- Acilius confusus Bergsten in Bergsten & K. B. Miller, 2006

Species of beetle

Acilius confusus is a species of predaceous diving beetle in the family Dytiscidae. It is found in North America.
