= Acilius abbreviatus =

Scientific classification
- Domain: Eukaryota
- Kingdom: Animalia
- Phylum: Arthropoda
- Class: Insecta
- Order: Coleoptera
- Suborder: Adephaga
- Family: Dytiscidae
- Genus: Acilius
- Species: A. abbreviatus

Binomial name
- Acilius abbreviatus Aubé, 1838

Synonyms
- Acilius latiusculus LeConte, 1857; Acilius simplex LeConte, 1852

Species of beetle

Acilius abbreviatus is a species of predaceous diving beetle in the family Dytiscidae. It is found in North America.
