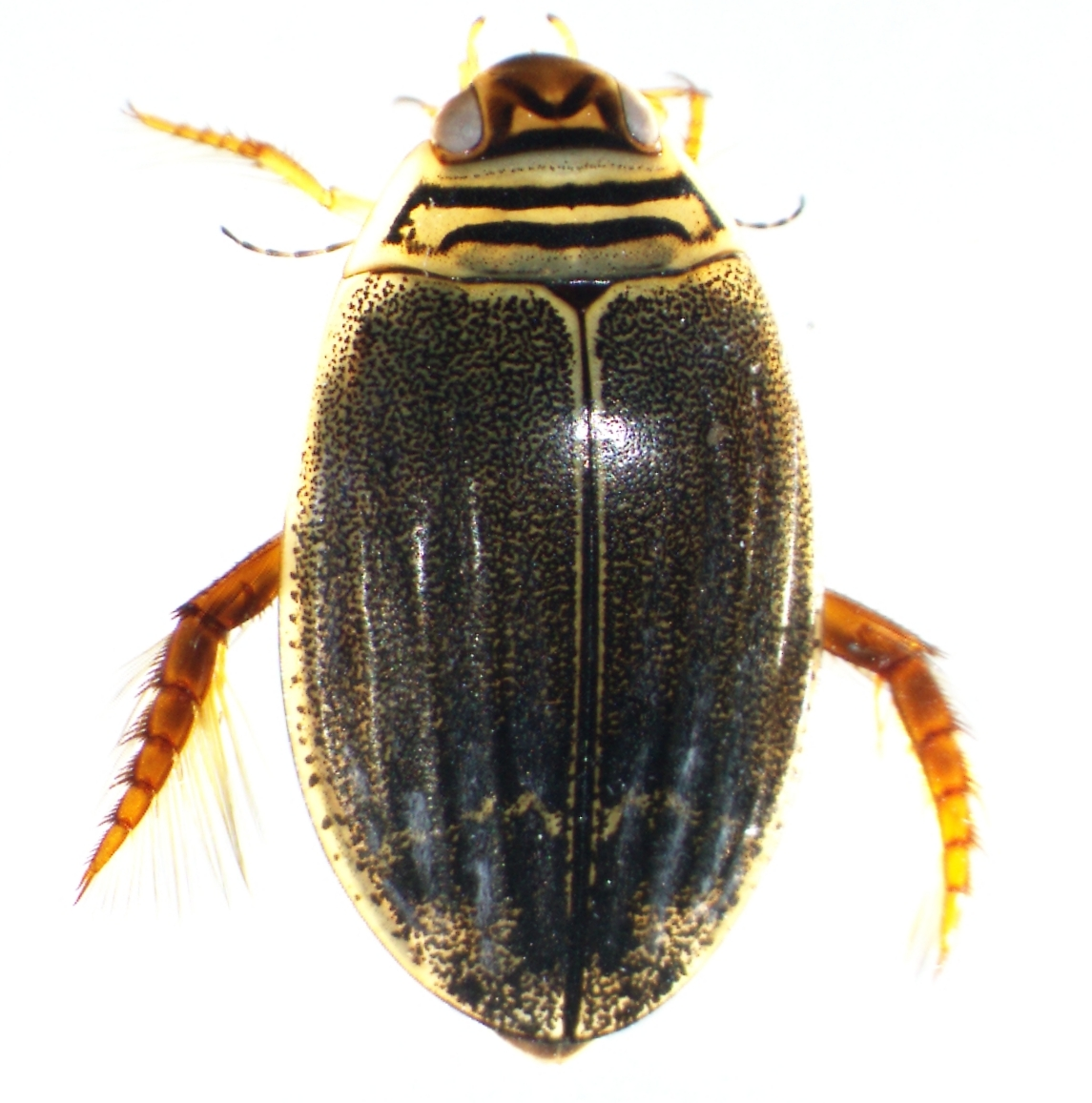

Scientific classification
- Domain: Eukaryota
- Kingdom: Animalia
- Phylum: Arthropoda
- Class: Insecta
- Order: Coleoptera
- Suborder: Adephaga
- Family: Dytiscidae
- Genus: Acilius
- Species: A. semisulcatus

Binomial name
- Acilius semisulcatus Aubé, 1838

= Acilius semisulcatus =

Species of beetle

Acilius semisulcatus is a species of predaceous diving beetle in the family Dytiscidae. It is found in North America.
