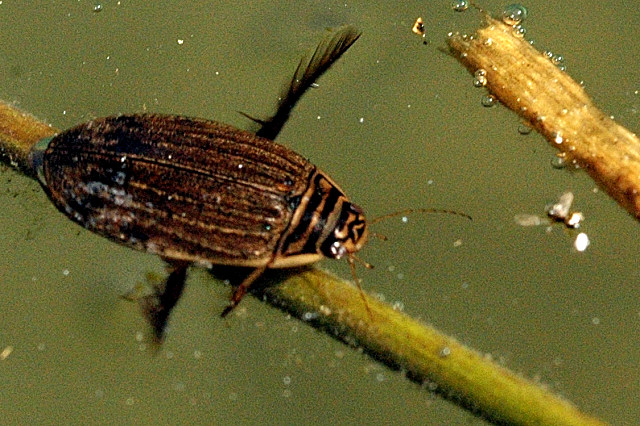
- Female

Scientific classification
- Kingdom: Animalia
- Phylum: Arthropoda
- Class: Insecta
- Order: Coleoptera
- Suborder: Adephaga
- Family: Dytiscidae
- Genus: Acilius
- Species: A. sulcatus

Binomial name
- Acilius sulcatus (Linnaeus, 1758)

Synonyms
- Dytiscus punctatus Scopoli, 1763; Dytiscus fasciatus De Geer, 1774; Dytiscus scopolii Gmelin, 1790; Acilius caliginosus Curtis, 1825; Acilius scoticus Stephens, 1828; Acilius varipes Stephens, 1828; Acilius brevis Aubé, 1837; Acilius laevisulcatus Motschulsky, 1845; Acilius tomentosus Motschulsky, 1845; Acilius blancki Peyerimhoff, 1927

= Acilius sulcatus =

Lesser Diving Beetle

Species of beetle

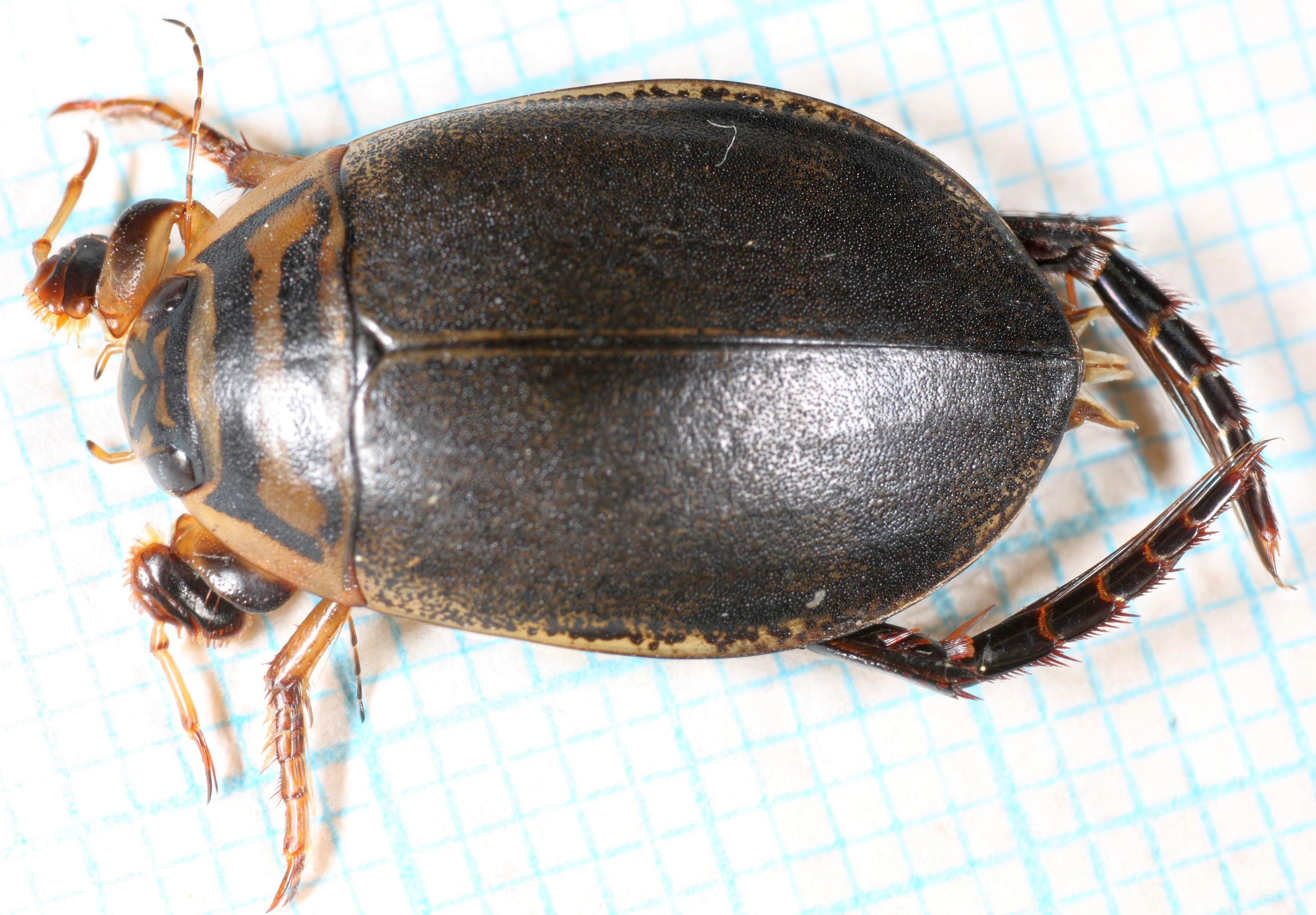
Male

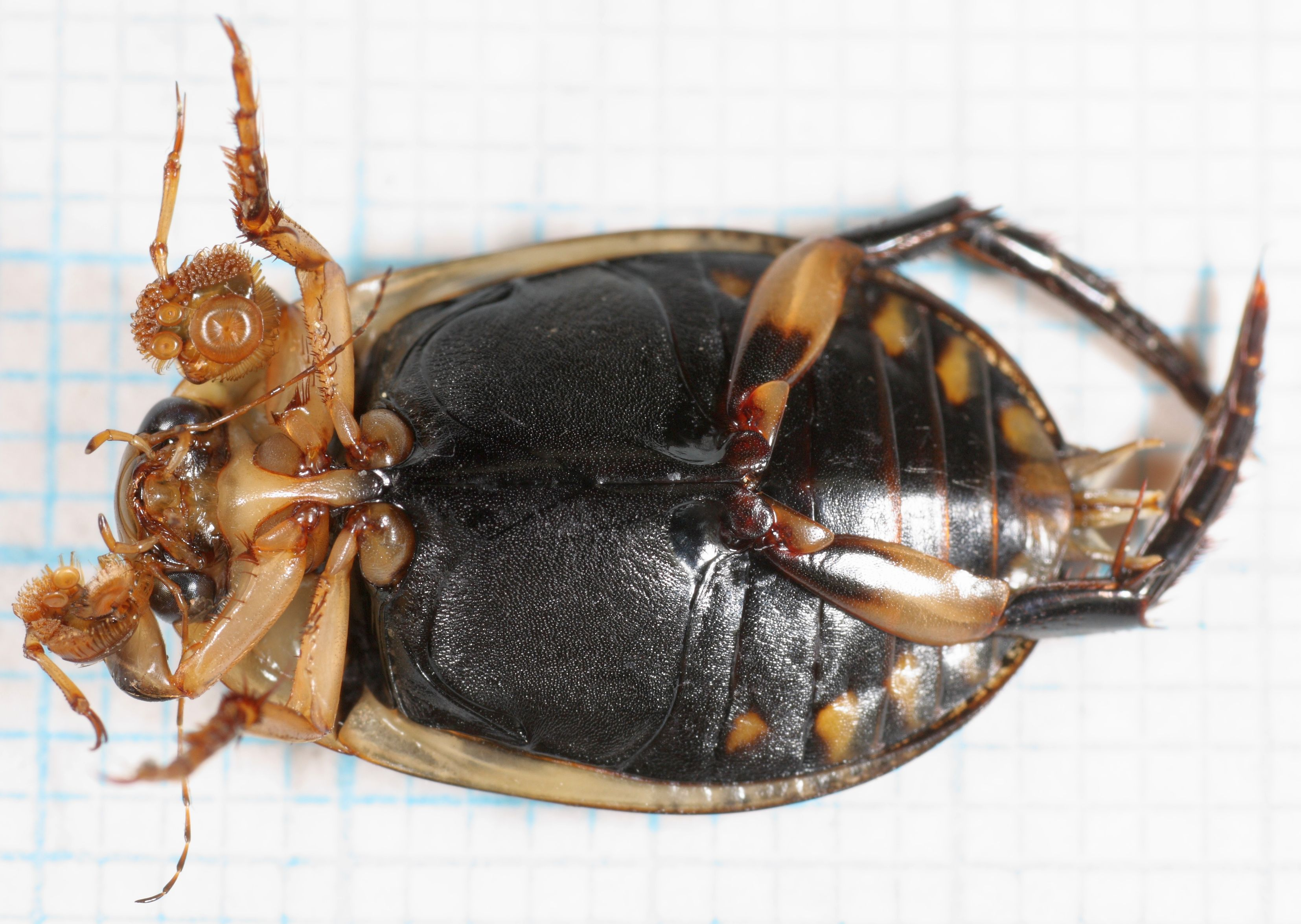
The male's front feet have suction cups

Acilius sulcatus, known as the lesser diving beetle, is a species of water beetle in the family Dytiscidae. It is fairly large (14.4 – 18.2 mm), with color variation shown throughout its range. Typically it is yellow and black.

== Range ==
A. sulcatus has a worldwide distribution but is found primarily in North Western Europe.

== Taxonomy ==
A. sulcatus is known throughout Europe as the lesser diving beetle, a common name shared with many other aquatic beetles in the family Dytiscidae.

== Habitat ==
Temporary and permanent water bodies. A. sulcatas shows a generalist response to habitat choice, living in bogs, ponds, streams, etc. As A. sulcatus is able to fly, it is not restricted to a single body of water. A. sulcatus is found in water bodies with high and low levels of vegetation, showing no preference between the two. They dominate in water bodies without any fish predators and are used as a primary indicator of predator presence.

== Environmental pressures ==
A. sulcatus is found over a large range and is not thought to face any pressures on the continuity of the species; as such, the beetle has not been evaluated by the IUCN. A unique morph is, however, recognized in the Akfadou mountains of Algeria and has the potential to attain separate species status. Habitat loss due to logging and allopatric separation from other populations means that the morph deserves special attention. Due to its fairly large distribution, A. sulcatus population numbers have been used as an aid in the measurement of the ecological health of wetlands.

== Life cycle ==
A. sulcatus is univoltine, with adults overwintering in deep permanent water bodies that neither dry out nor freeze completely. Mating pairs are found in both the spring and autumn. Females lay their eggs near water on the underside of plant matter. Eggs hatch after about one week. Larval development takes about 30 days, and pupal development takes another 16–28 days.

== Feeding ==
A. sulcatus is a predatory diving beetle which feeds upon small invertebrate and vertebrate prey. Larvae prefer micro-invertebrate prey, such as Daphnia, whereas adults select size-appropriate prey. Known for its high aquatic speed, A. sulcatus actively pursues prey rather than using a sit-and wait ambush strategy seen in other arthropods. A. sulcatus is active both day and night. A. sulcatus larvae capture prey headfirst with their mandibles before injecting digestive enzymes for extra oral digestion. Adults do not use extra oral digestion, instead using their strong mouth parts to devour prey.

== Morphology ==
Color varies throughout the range of A. sulcatus and is not a good identifying characteristic; however, A. sulcatus shows many unique structural morphologies useful for identification. A. sulcatus is easily recognized by its large, distinctive hind legs. The hind legs are long and fringed with setae, forming a paddle-like shape when spread. The body is always wider than the height of the insect, and is streamlined (no spines or other chitinous structures protruding). As in all Dytiscidae beetles, the sternal keel is absent. A. sulcatus is clumsy on land, but it is well adapted for an aquatic lifestyle and is a strong flier. A. sulcatus may also be recognized by its unique reproductive structures. Males have three ventral suction disks used to secure the male to the slippery female during reproduction. Male attachment to females is detrimental to female survival as the mating period may attract predators. To avoid potential death in mating females show modifications of the elytra. The elytra is highly grooved with many suberect setae, making male attachment far more difficult. The male elytra is smooth without setae showing high levels of sexual dimorphism. The competition between the sexes has led to an evolutionary sexual arms race.

== Defensive strategy ==
Aquatic beetles in the family Dytiscidae possess defensive glands used to secrete agents repellent and toxic to vertebrate predators. Secretions primarily contain steroids synthesized from cholesterol. The steroids secreted act to anesthetize predators, leading to narcosis. The steroids produced vary in levels of toxicity depending on food availability and photoperiod. A. sulcatus is highly adapted for aquatic movement and can make effective use of its speed to escape threats. When tested against 72 other common water beetle species, A. sulcatus was shown to have the highest movement velocity. During the day, A. sulcatus uses primarily visual information to avoid predators; however, in low-light conditions, chemical signals are used as the dominant cues for avoidance.). It has also been suggested that a 'humming' sound, produced by an interaction of the wings and the elytra, is used as a defensive strategy by causing an unpleasant vibrating sensation in the mouth of a predator.

== Bio-control ==
Although it has not been put into practice, laboratory tests have shown A. sulcatus to be a highly effective predator of mosquito larvae. As such, its use as an environmentally friendly bio-control device is being examined.

== Gallery ==
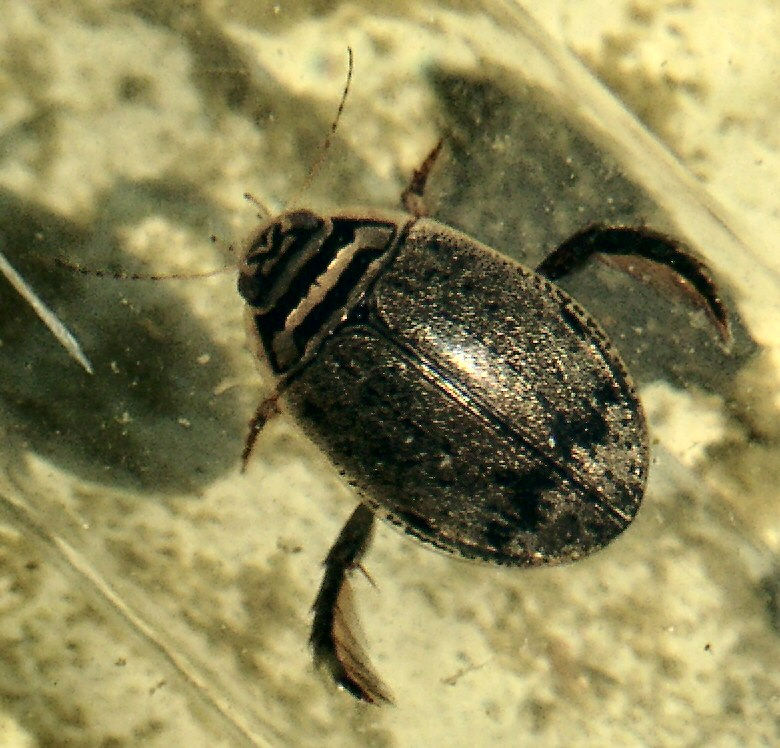
Acilius sulcatus female

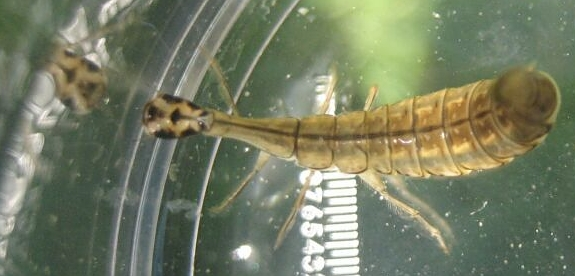
Larva

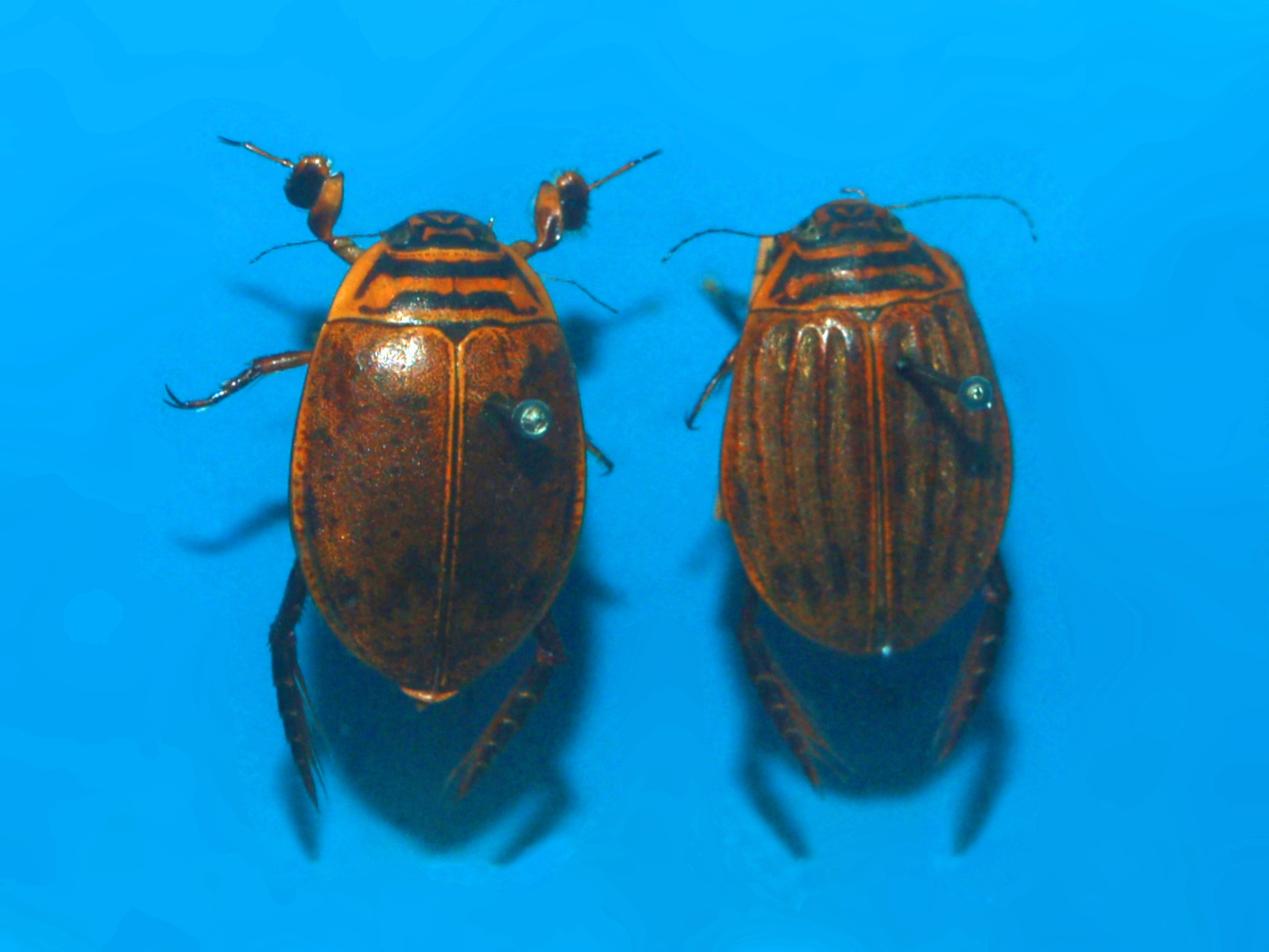
Acilius sulcatus, male and female; mounted specimen

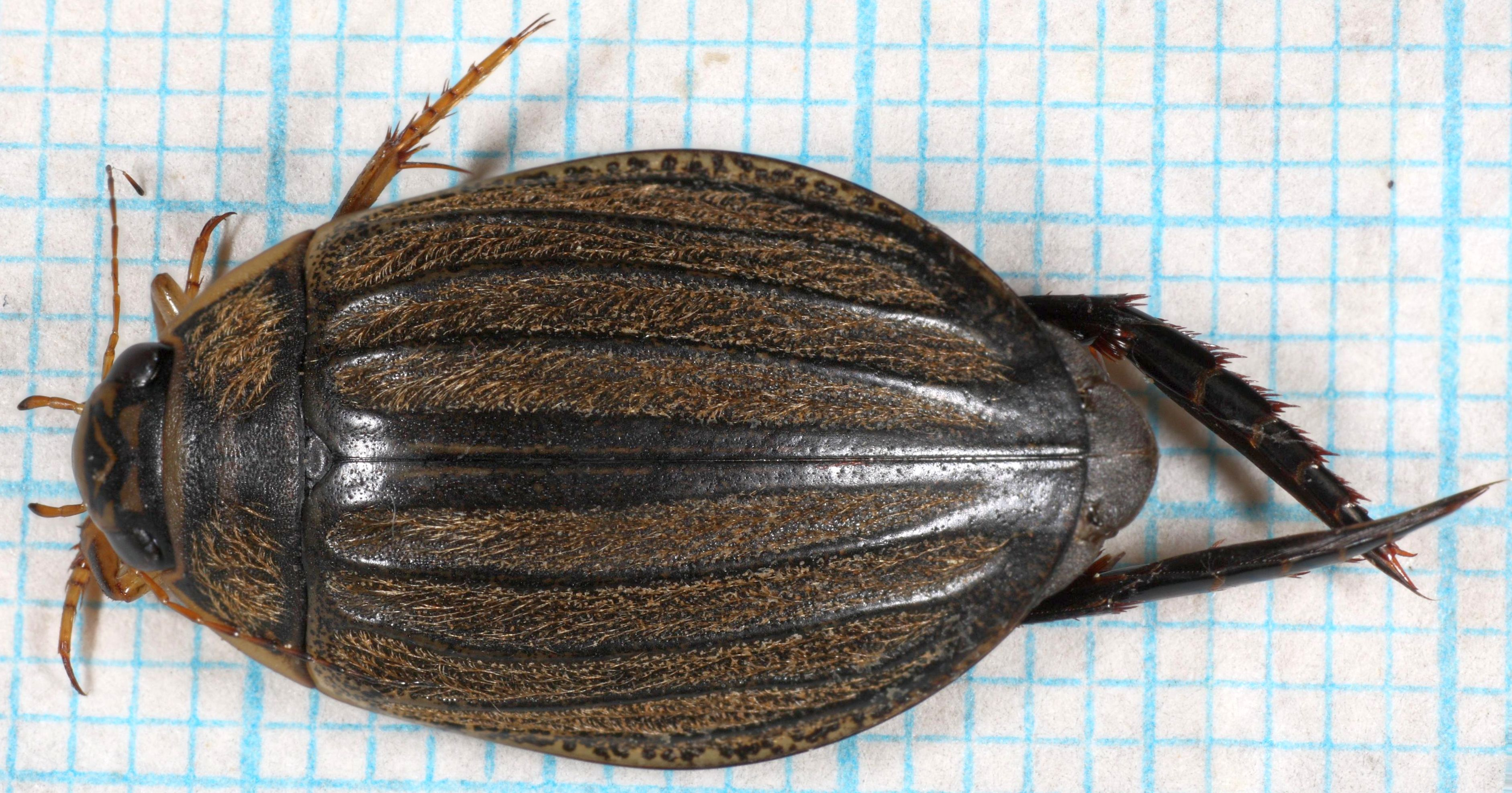
Female dorsal side

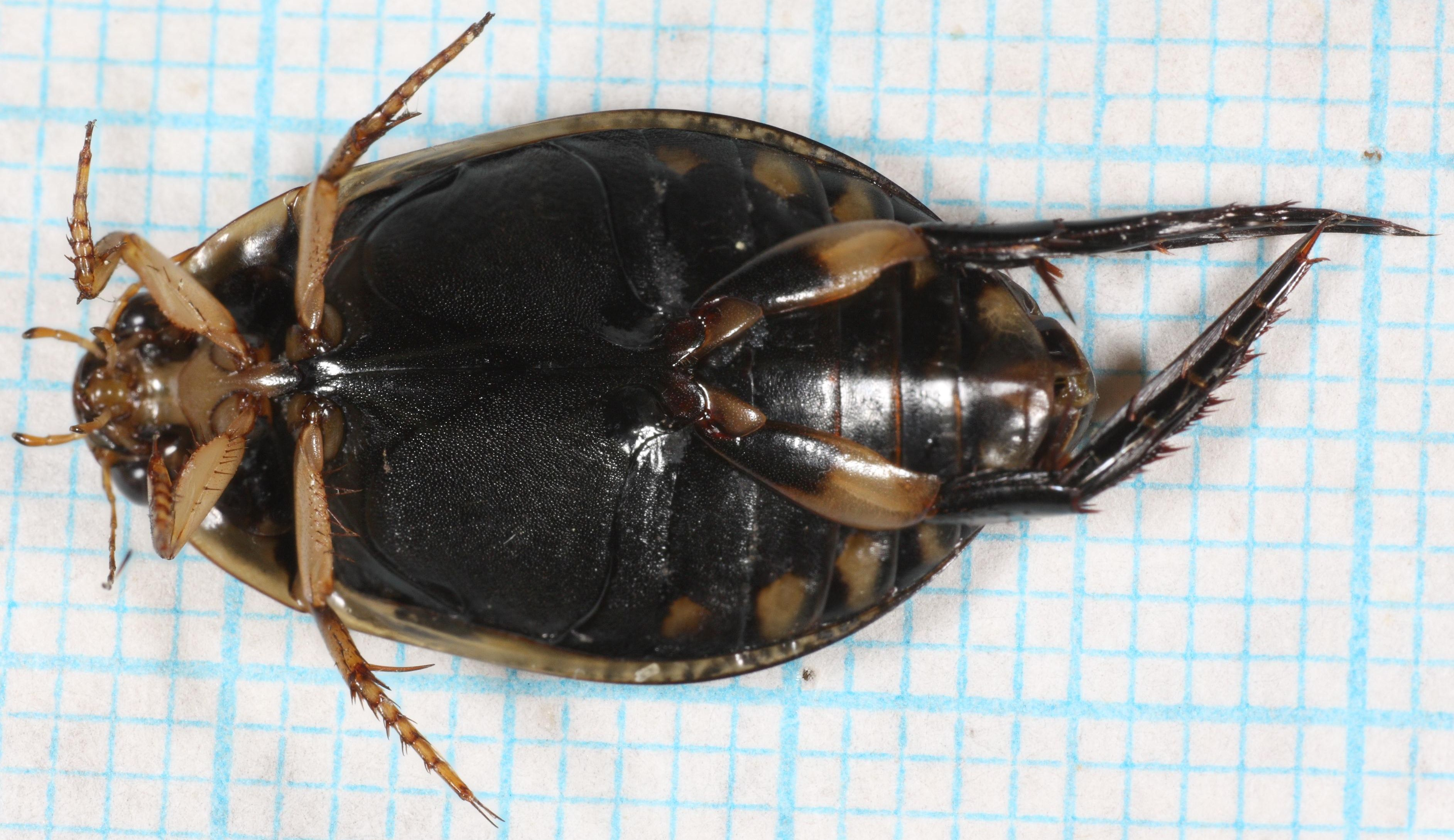
Female ventral side
