= Acilius duvergeri =

Conservation status
- Vulnerable (IUCN 2.3)

Scientific classification
- Kingdom: Animalia
- Phylum: Arthropoda
- Class: Insecta
- Order: Coleoptera
- Suborder: Adephaga
- Family: Dytiscidae
- Genus: Acilius
- Species: A. duvergeri

Binomial name
- Acilius duvergeri Dettner, 1982

Species of beetle

Acilius duvergeri is a species of beetle in family Dytiscidae. It is found in Algeria, Italy, Morocco, Portugal, and Spain.
