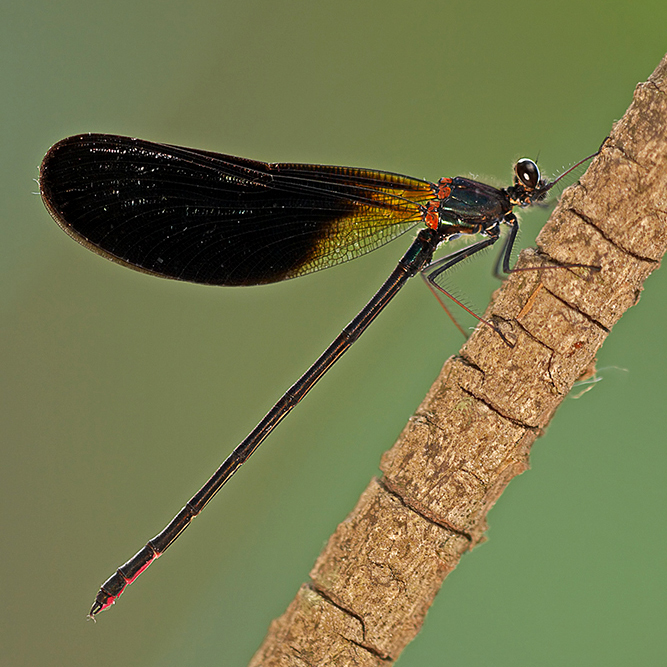
- Calopteryx haemorrhoidalis, male

Conservation status
- Least Concern (IUCN 3.1)

Scientific classification
- Kingdom: Animalia
- Phylum: Arthropoda
- Class: Insecta
- Order: Odonata
- Suborder: Zygoptera
- Family: Calopterygidae
- Genus: Calopteryx
- Species: C. haemorrhoidalis

Binomial name
- Calopteryx haemorrhoidalis Vander Linden, 1825

= Calopteryx haemorrhoidalis =

Species of damselfly

Calopteryx haemorrhoidalis is a species of damselfly in the family Calopterygidae known by the common names copper demoiselle and Mediterranean demoiselle.

Clip of Calopteryx haemorrhoidalis

== Subspecies ==
Subspecies include:

- Calopteryx haemorrhoidalis almogravensis Hartung, 1996
- Calopteryx haemorrhoidalis asturica Ocharan, 1983
- Calopteryx haemorrhoidalis haemorrhoidalis (Vander Linden, 1825)
- Calopteryx haemorrhoidalis occasi Capra, 1945

== Distribution ==
This species is native to the western Mediterranean Basin in Europe (Iberia, southern France, Italy, Monaco) and North Africa (Algeria, Morocco, Tunisia). It is common in much of its range.

== Habitat ==
It lives along rivers and streams, but also in sunny larger waters. Though it may be affected by habitat changes such as water pollution.

== Description ==
Calopteryx haemorrhoidalis can reach a body length of about 45–48 millimetres (1.8–1.9 in). The abdomen length is of about 34–43 millimetres (1.3–1.7 in) in males, of 31–43 millimetres (1.2–1.7 in) in females. The length of the wings is of 23–32 millimetres (0.91–1.26 in) in males, of 25–37 millimetres (0.98–1.46 in) in the females.

The males have a dark, metallic shining body, the color of which can be red-violet, golden or copper-colored. On the underside of the last three abdominal segments there red area, the so-called "red lantern" (hence the Latin species name haemorrhoidalis, meaning "blood flow"). The wings of males show a large dark area, while the females have a brown band to the wing tip and a metallic-green to bronze-colored body, with a brown belt on the back.

== Biology ==
The flight time of this species ranges from May to September. The males have a characteristic mating dance, showing the abdomen end and spreading their wings wide. The male of this species is territorial, defending sites where females may choose to lay eggs.

This species can hybridize with Calopteryx splendens.

== Gallery ==
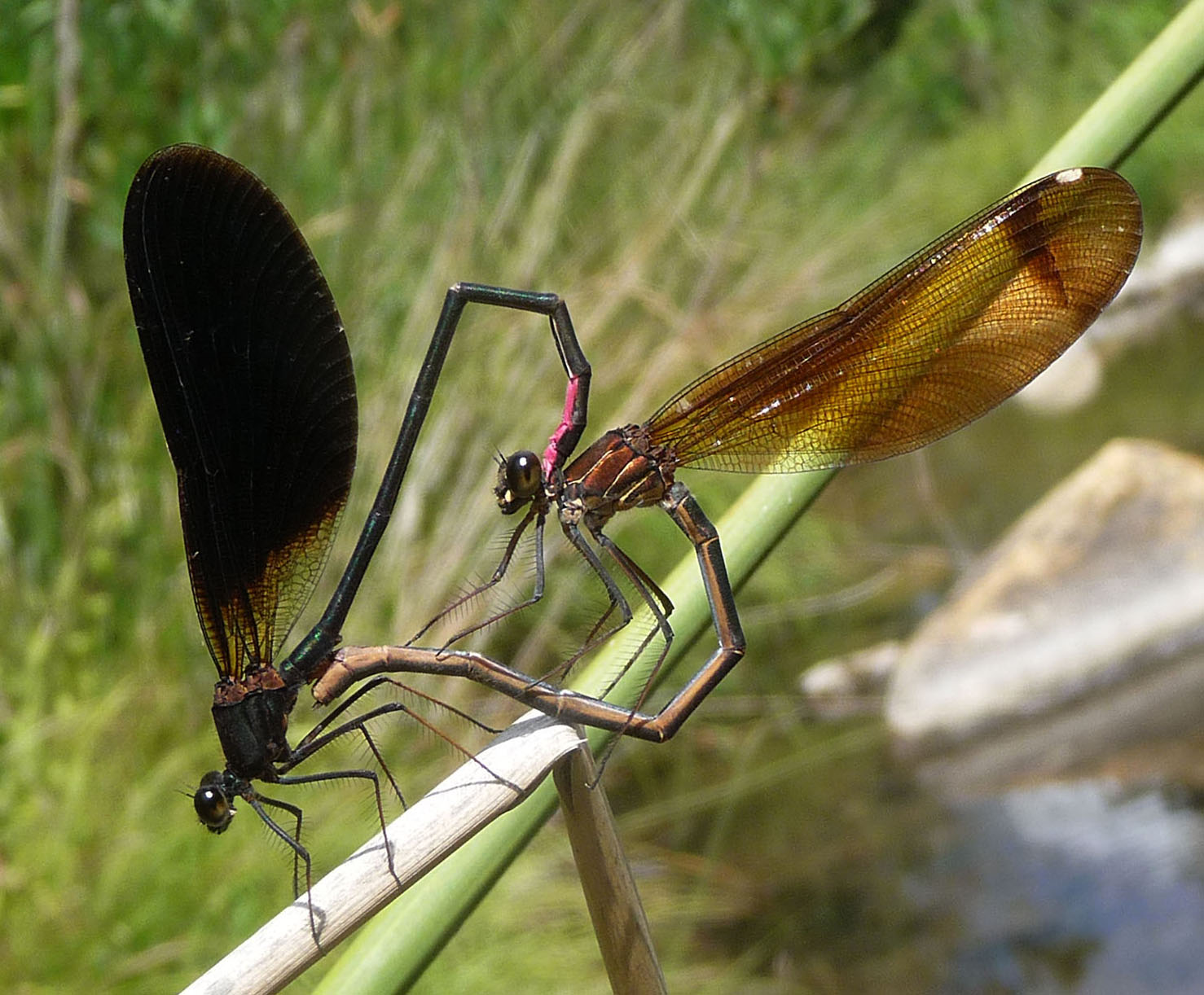
Mating pair

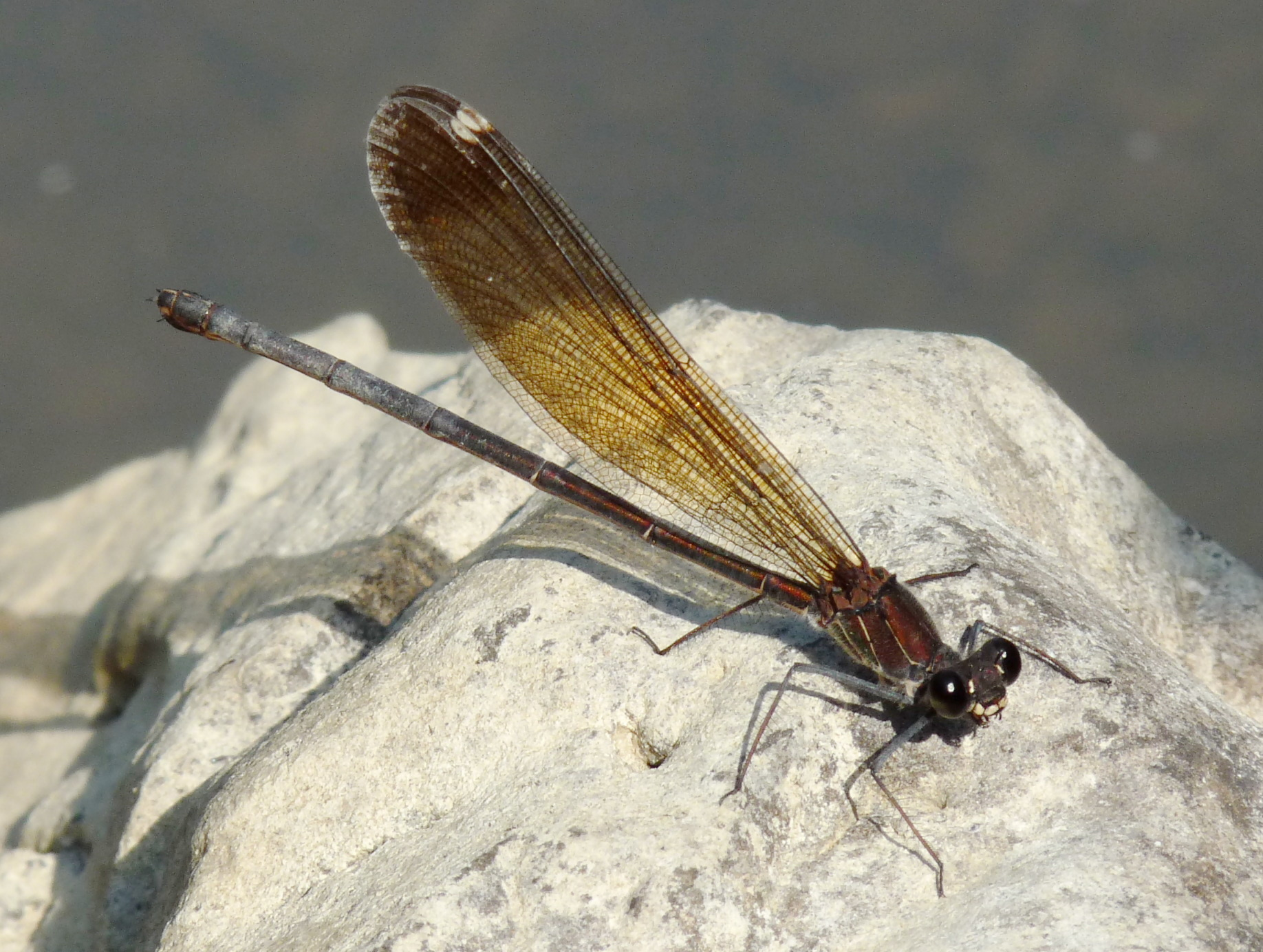
Female

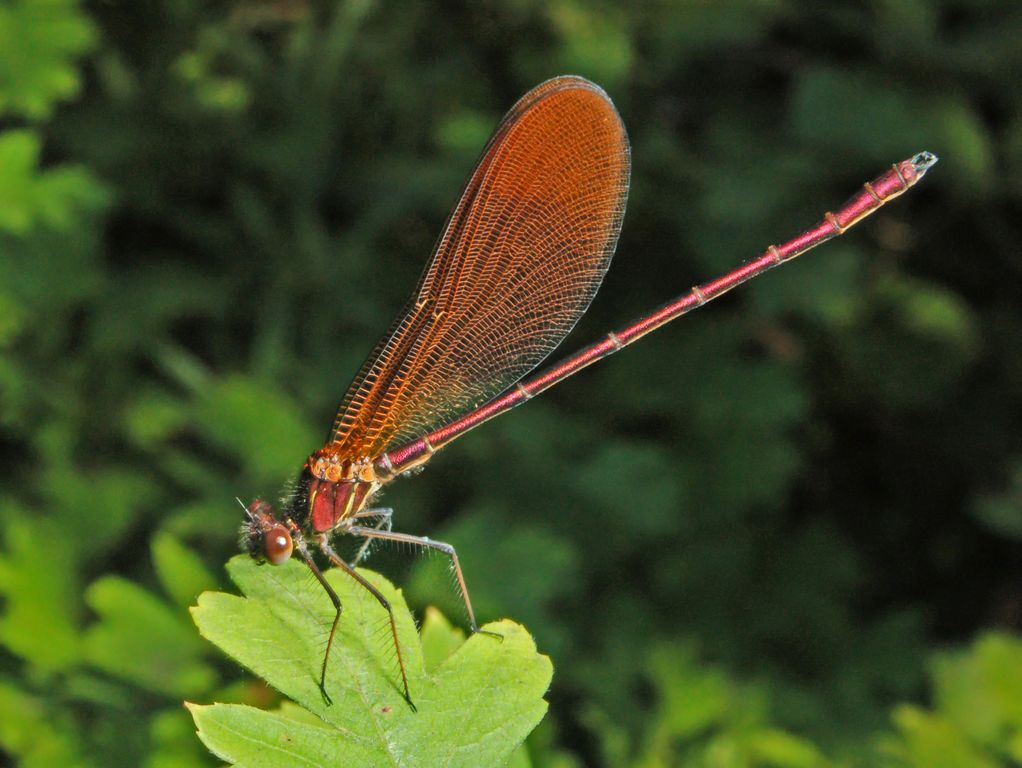
Calopteryx haemorrhoidalis occasi. Immature male

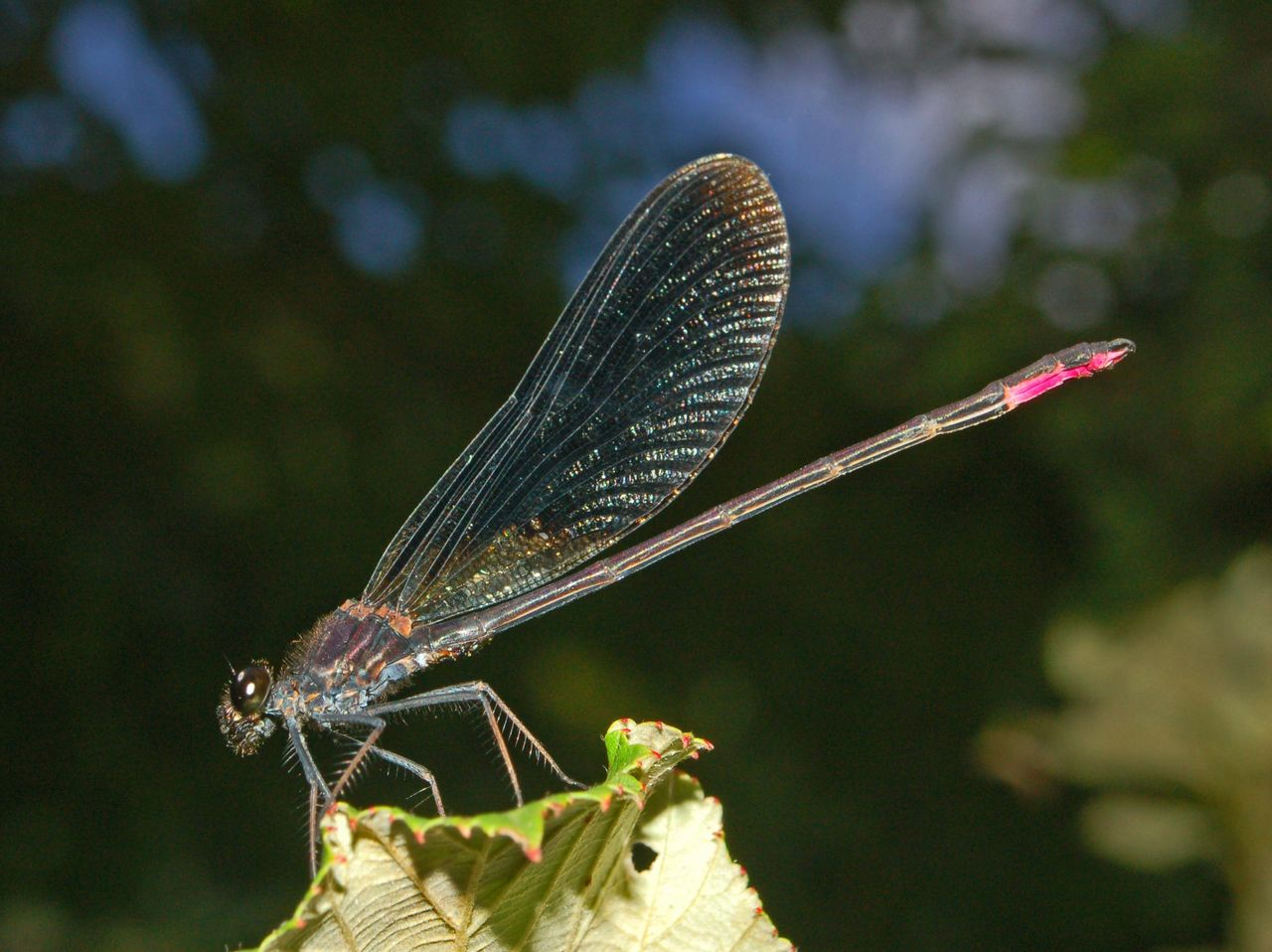
Calopteryx haemorrhoidalis occasi. Male

== Bibliography ==
- B. Misof, C.L. Anderson, H. Hadrys A phylogeny of the damselfly genus Calopteryx (Odonata) using mitochondrial 16S rDNA markers. in: Molecular Phylogenetics and Evolution. Academic Press, Orlando Fla. 15.2000, 1, 5–14. ISSN 1095-9513
- K.-D. B. Dijkstra, illustrations: R. Lewington, Guide des libellules de France et d'Europe, Delachaux et Niestlé, Paris, 2007, ISBN 978-2-603-01639-8.
- Van Der Linden, 1825 : Monographiae Libellullinarum Europaearum Specimen.
