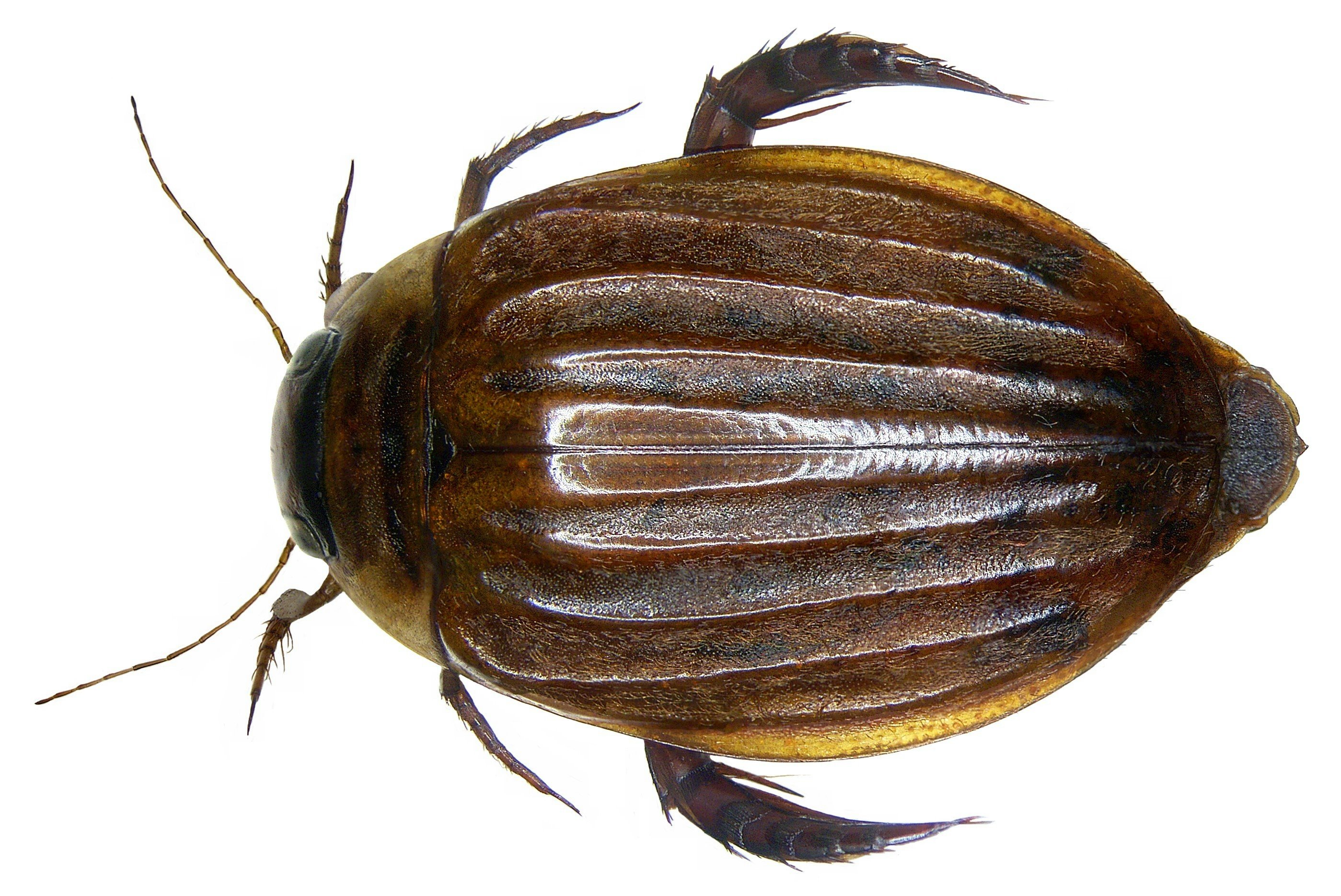
- Acilius sinensis

Scientific classification
- Kingdom: Animalia
- Phylum: Arthropoda
- Class: Insecta
- Order: Coleoptera
- Suborder: Adephaga
- Family: Dytiscidae
- Subfamily: Dytiscinae
- Tribe: Aciliini
- Genus: Acilius; Leach, 1817

= Acilius (beetle) =

Genus of beetles

Acilius is a holarctic genus of diving beetles in the family Dytiscidae and typically has a life cycle that is univoltine.

Despite the prevalence of some species, one species, A. duvergeri, is listed as vulnerable on the IUCN Red List.

== Species ==
The genus Acilius contains the following 13 extant species in 2 subgenera:
Subgenus Acilius:

- Acilius abbreviatus Aubé, 1838
- Acilius athabascae Larson, 1975
- Acilius canaliculatus (Nicolai, 1822)
- Acilius confusus Bergsten, 2006
- Acilius fraternus (Harris, 1828)
- Acilius japonicus Brinck, 1939
- Acilius kishii Nakane, 1963
- Acilius mediatus (Say, 1823)
- Acilius semisulcatus Aubé, 1838
- Acilius sinensis Peschet, 1915
- Acilius sulcatus (Linnaeus, 1758)
- Acilius sylvanus Hilsenhoff, 1975

Subgenus Homoelytrus

- Acilius duvergeri Gobert, 1874

== Extinct species ==
These three extinct species are known only from fossils:

- †Acilius florissantensis Wickham, 1909
- †Acilius oeningensis (Heer, 1847)
- †Acilius praesulcatus Lomnicki, 1894
