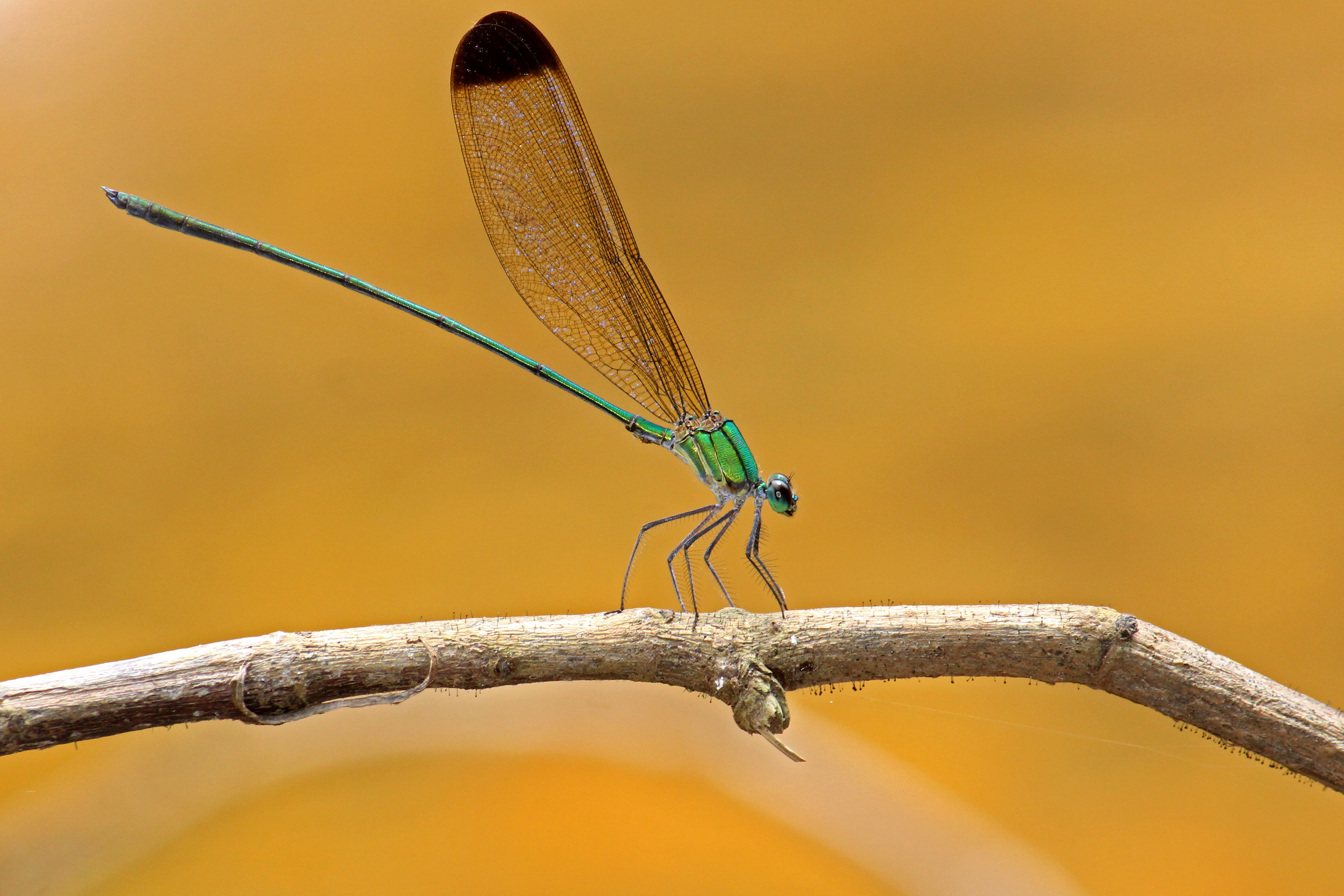
- Male
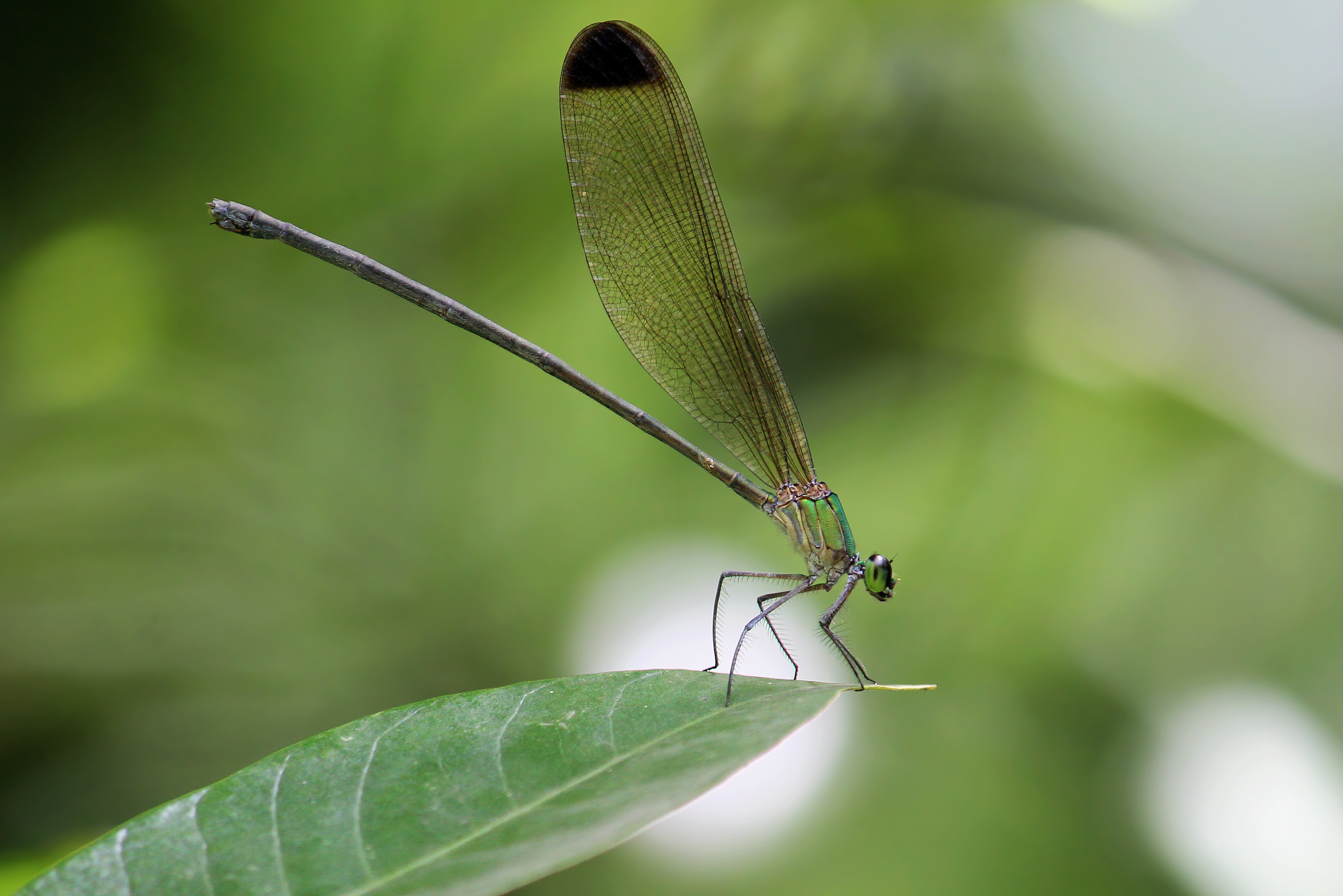
- Female

Conservation status
- Least Concern (IUCN 3.1)

Scientific classification
- Kingdom: Animalia
- Phylum: Arthropoda
- Clade: Pancrustacea
- Class: Insecta
- Order: Odonata
- Suborder: Zygoptera
- Family: Calopterygidae
- Genus: Vestalis
- Species: V. apicalis

Binomial name
- Vestalis apicalis Sélys, 1873

= Vestalis apicalis =

Black-tipped forest glory

Species of damselfly

Vestalis apicalis, or the black-tipped forest glory, is a species of damselfly belonging to the family Calopterygidae. It is found in India and Sri Lanka.

== Subspecies ==
V. apicalis apicalis is commonly found in the hill streams of Western Ghats. Two more subspecies are recognised; V. a. nigrescens Fraser 1929 from Sri Lanka and V. a. submontana Fraser 1934 from India. Records of V. a. submontana are from the Nilgiri Hills and Eastern Ghats. V. a. nigrescens is confined to Sri Lanka, where it appears to be quite widely distributed. V. a. submontana is now considered as a separate species Vestalis submontana.

== Description and habitat ==
It is a large metallic emerald-green colored damselfly with brown capped yellowish green eyes. The apices of all wings are broadly tipped with blackish-brown. Female is similar to the male; but dull colors and the apical marking usually paler and less sharply defined. It breeds in forest streams. Commonly seen as a group rest among bushes in forest paths and shades together with Vestalis gracilis.

== See also ==
- List of odonates of India
- List of odonata of Kerala
