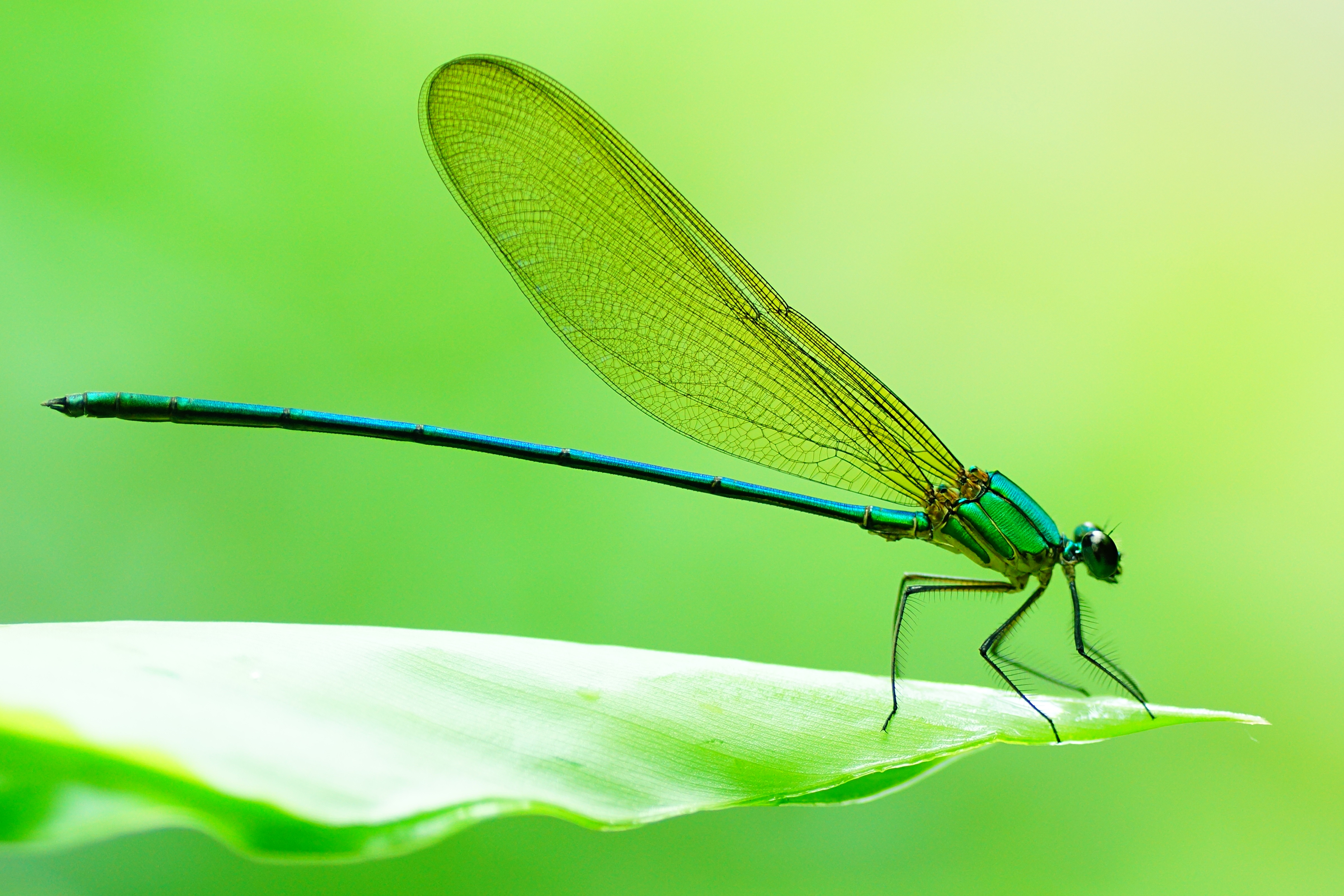
- Male
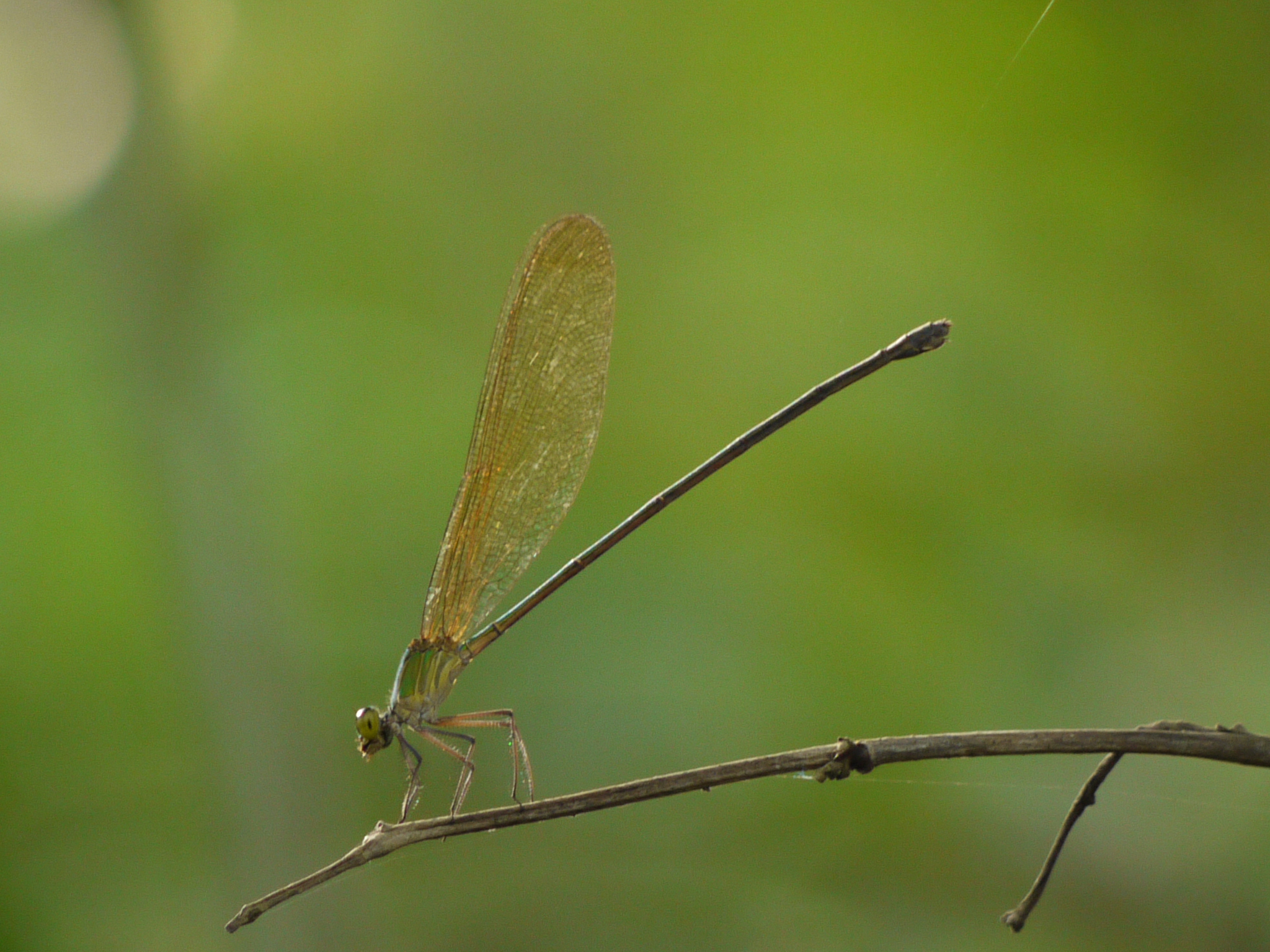
- Female

Conservation status
- Least Concern (IUCN 3.1)

Scientific classification
- Kingdom: Animalia
- Phylum: Arthropoda
- Clade: Pancrustacea
- Class: Insecta
- Order: Odonata
- Suborder: Zygoptera
- Family: Calopterygidae
- Genus: Vestalis
- Species: V. gracilis

Binomial name
- Vestalis gracilis (Rambur, 1842)

Synonyms
- Calopteryx gracilis Rambur, 1842

= Vestalis gracilis =

Clear-winged forest glory

Species of damselfly

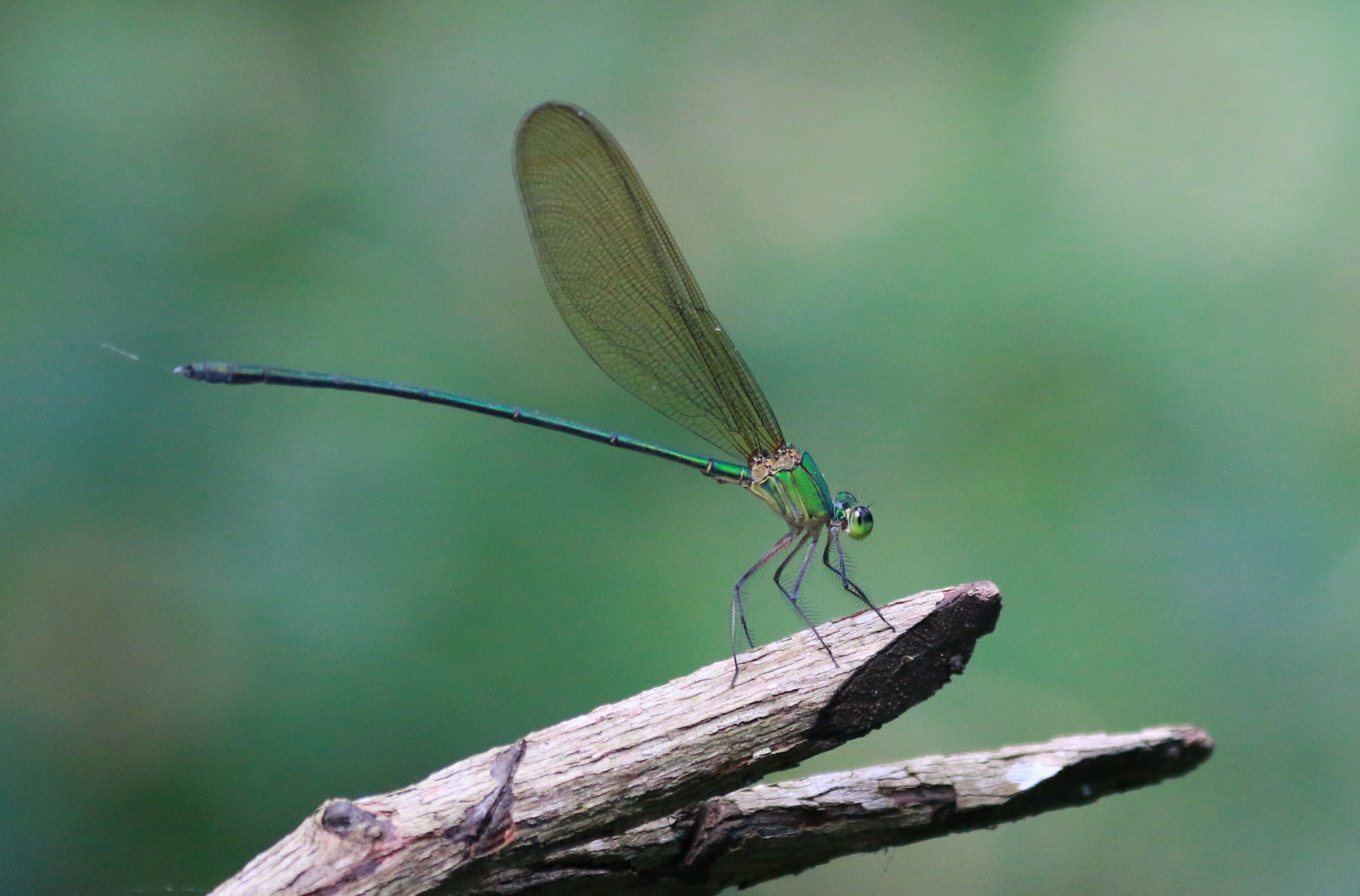
Vestalis gracilis, Clear-winged Forest Glory

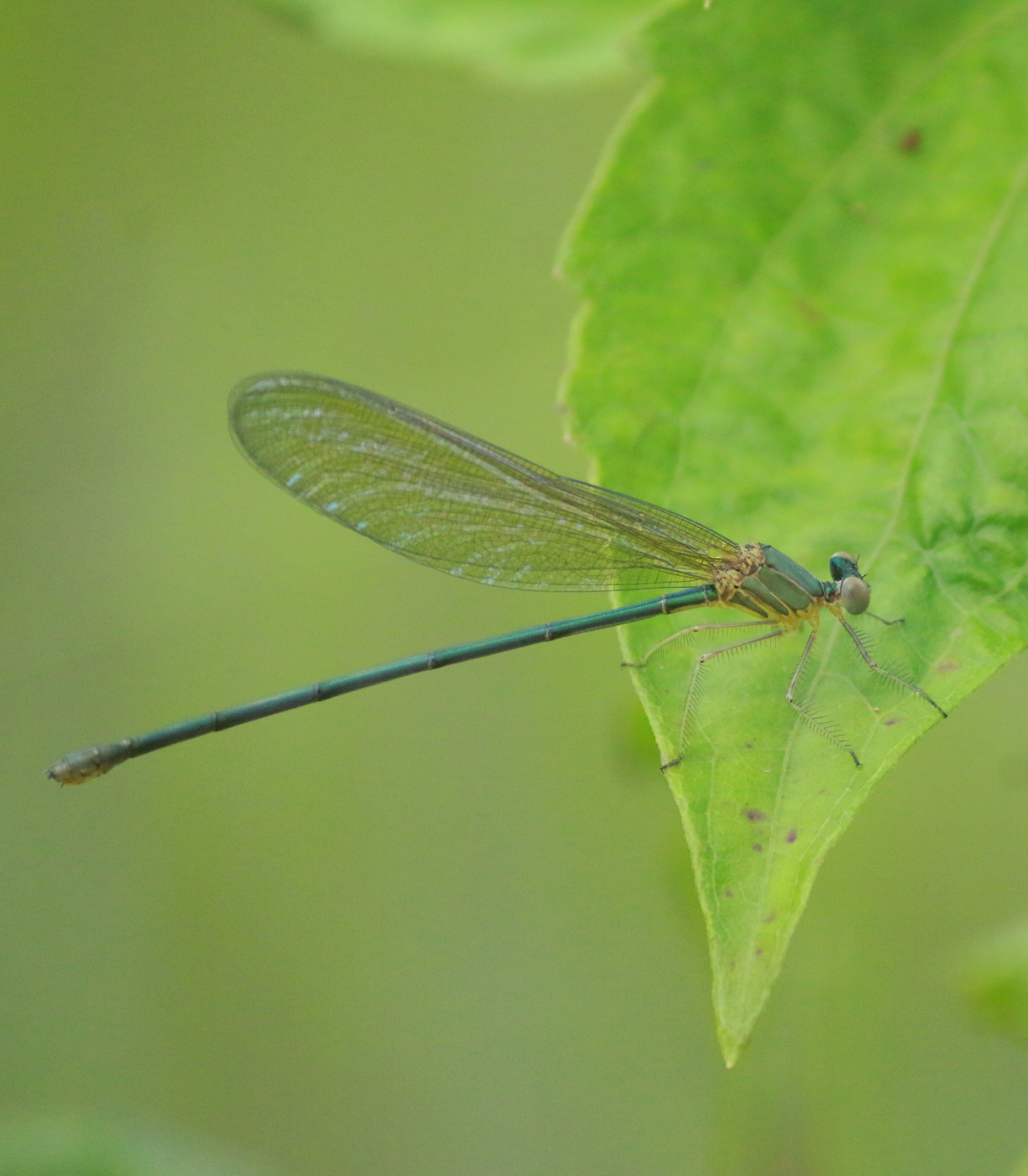
Vestalis gracilis young male

Vestalis gracilis, is a species of damselfly belonging to the family Calopterygidae. It is known commonly as the clear-winged forest glory or clear-winged flash-wing. It is native to Southeast Asia and surrounding regions.

== Description ==
The male and female are similar in size; the male having an abdomen 45 to 46 millimeters long and a hindwing 34 to 38 millimeters long and the female with an abdomen 43 to 50 millimeters long and a hindwing 36 to 39 millimeters long.

The male is iridescent green with a yellow and black underside. It has brown legs and blue-tinged transparent wings. The eyes are dark brown above and greenish yellow below. The female is duller greenish brown in color.

== Habitat ==
This is a common species across much of its range. It breeds in forest streams, often in disturbed and cultivated areas too. Commonly seen as a group rest among bushes in forest paths and shades together with Vestalis apicalis.

== Subspecies ==
A subspecies, V. g. montana Fraser, 1934, has been described from Western Ghats of South India. It is now synonymised with V. a. submontana and is considered as a separate species Vestalis submontana.

== See also ==
- List of odonates of India
- List of odonata of Kerala
