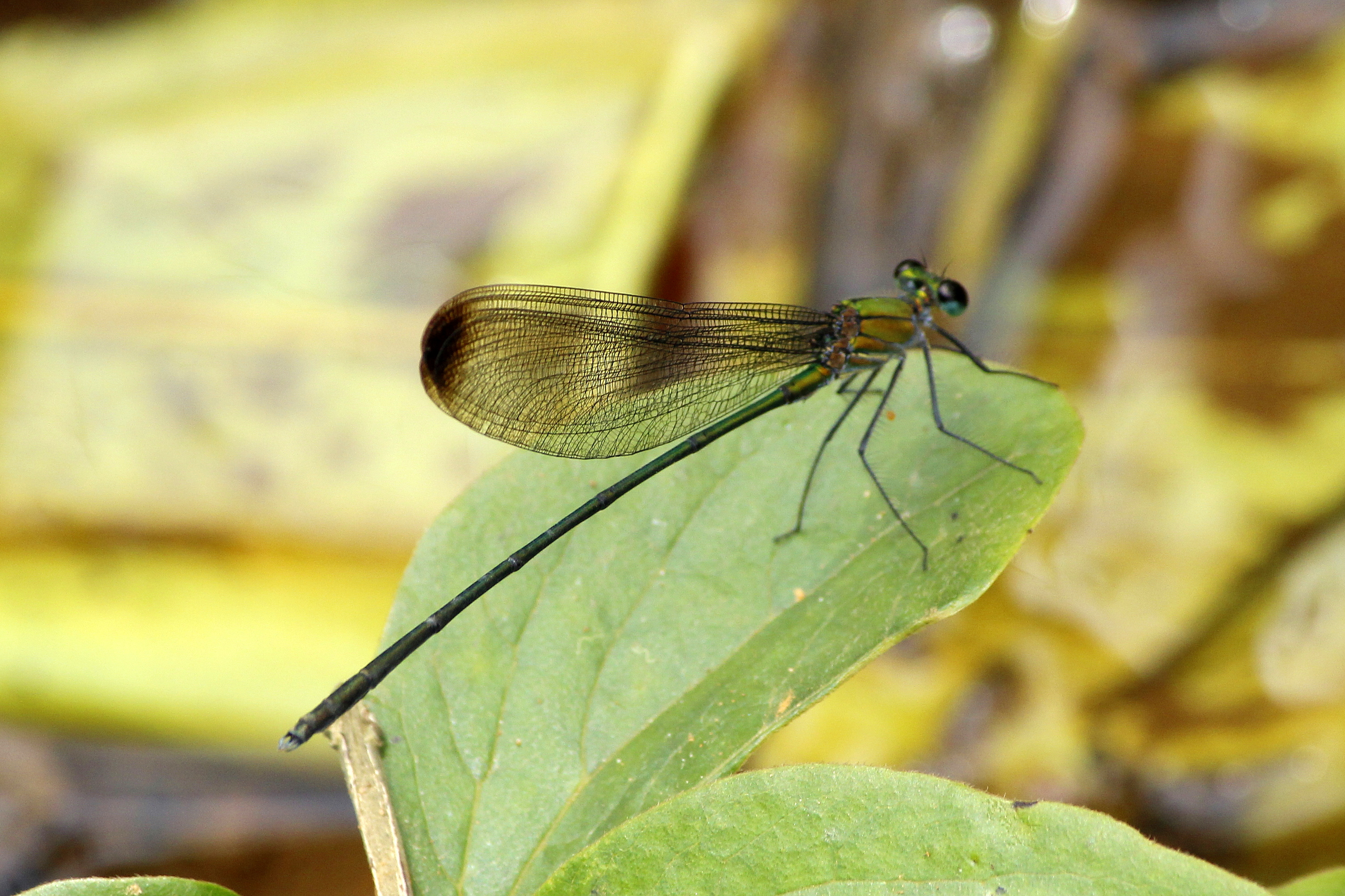
- Male
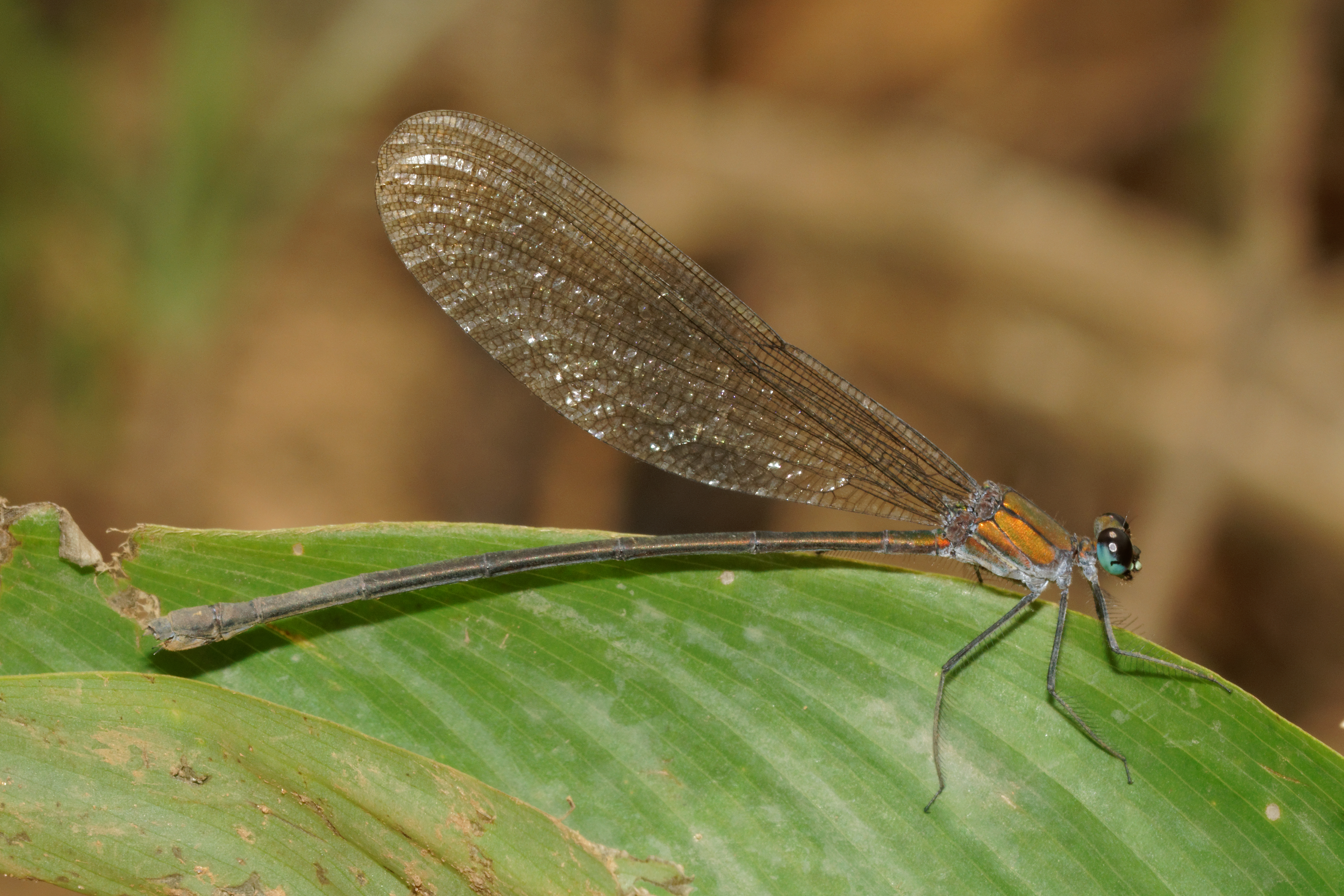
- Female

Conservation status
- Least Concern (IUCN 3.1)

Scientific classification
- Kingdom: Animalia
- Phylum: Arthropoda
- Clade: Pancrustacea
- Class: Insecta
- Order: Odonata
- Suborder: Zygoptera
- Family: Calopterygidae
- Genus: Vestalis
- Species: V. submontana

Binomial name
- Vestalis submontana Fraser, 1934

Synonyms
- Vestalis gracilis montana Fraser, 1934; Vestalis apicalis submontana Fraser, 1934

= Vestalis submontana =

Species of damselfly

Vestalis submontana is a species of damselfly belonging to the family Calopterygidae. It is principally found in the Western Ghats of India, with some records further east.

Frederic Charles Fraser described two new subspecies Vestalis gracilis amaena and Vestalis apicalis amaena in 1929 and later gave replacement names Vestalis gracilis montana and Vestalis apicalis submontana in 1934. The type specimens were from Nilgiri mountains in Western Ghats of South India.

Matti Hämäläinen studied the type specimens of these taxa and other material preserved in collections of BMNH (London), IRSN (Brussels) and RMNH (Leiden) in 2011. He concluded that there is striking structural and colour differences which indicate that submontana is a distinct species. And its sympatric occurrence with V. apicalis and V. gracilis alone rules out its former subspecies status. So V. a. submontana is now considered as a separate species Vestalis submontana Fraser 1934 and Vestalis gracilis montana Fraser, 1934 a synonym of it.

== Description and habitat ==
It is similar to Vestalis apicalis and Vestalis gracilis; but the face is black and the black apex of wings much restricted, occupying only about 2·5 mm. It is not sharply defined in young males and in females. The body color is dull golden-bronzed metallic green. It is a bit smaller than the other two species. The structure of the male appendages is also different. The inferior appendages are proportionally longer than the other two species.

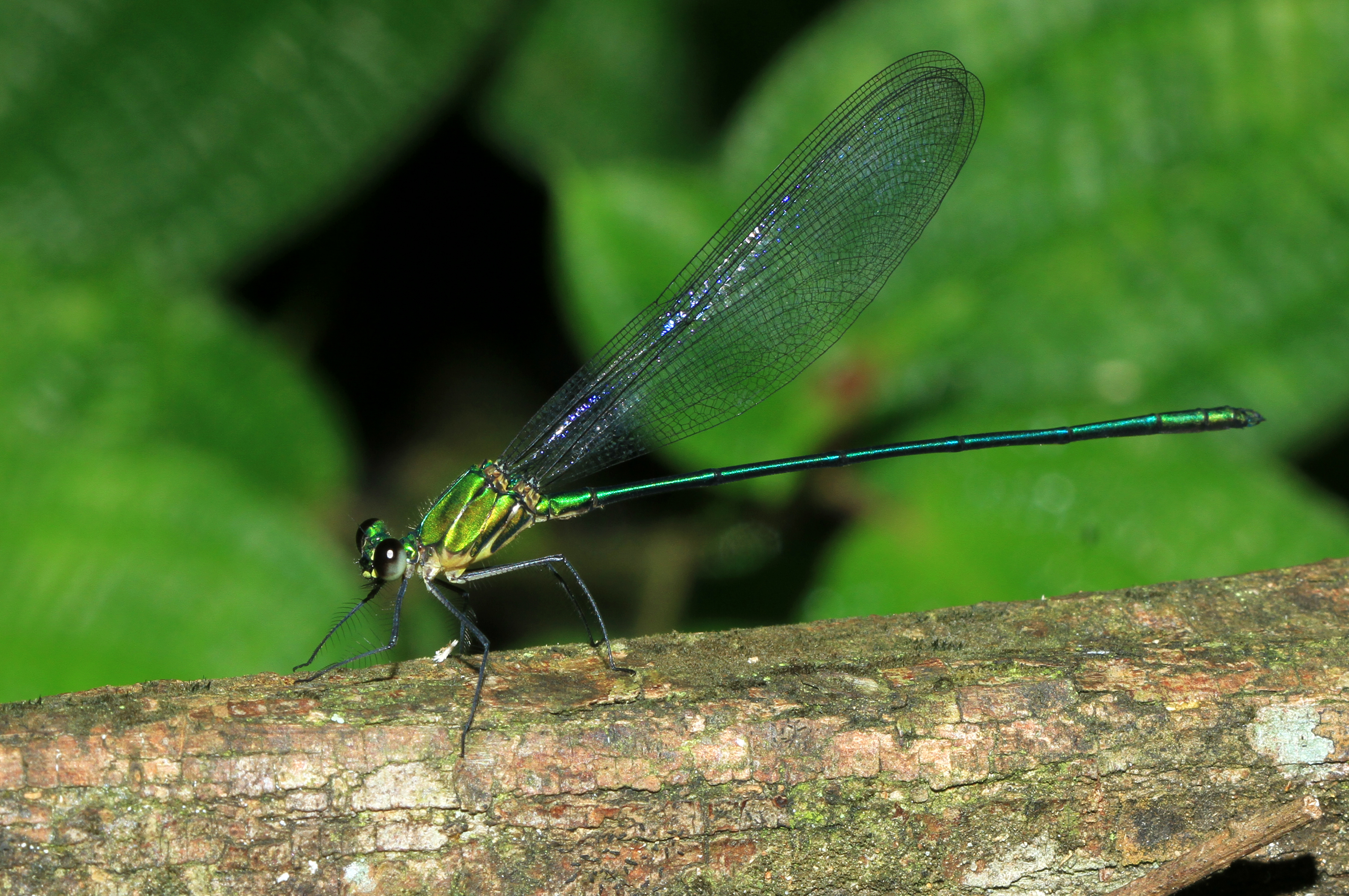
Male (sub-adult)

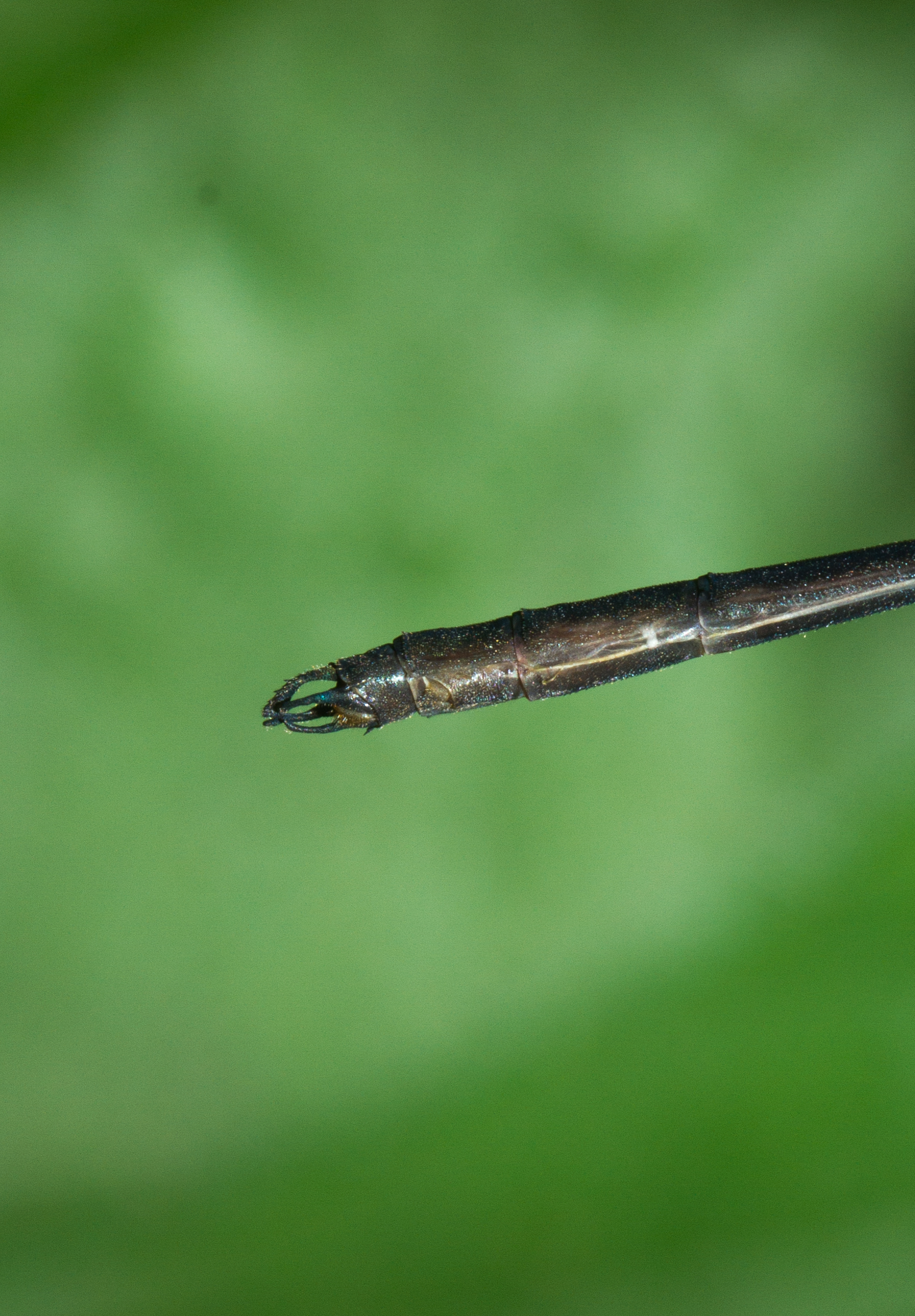
Caudal appendages of male (lateral view)

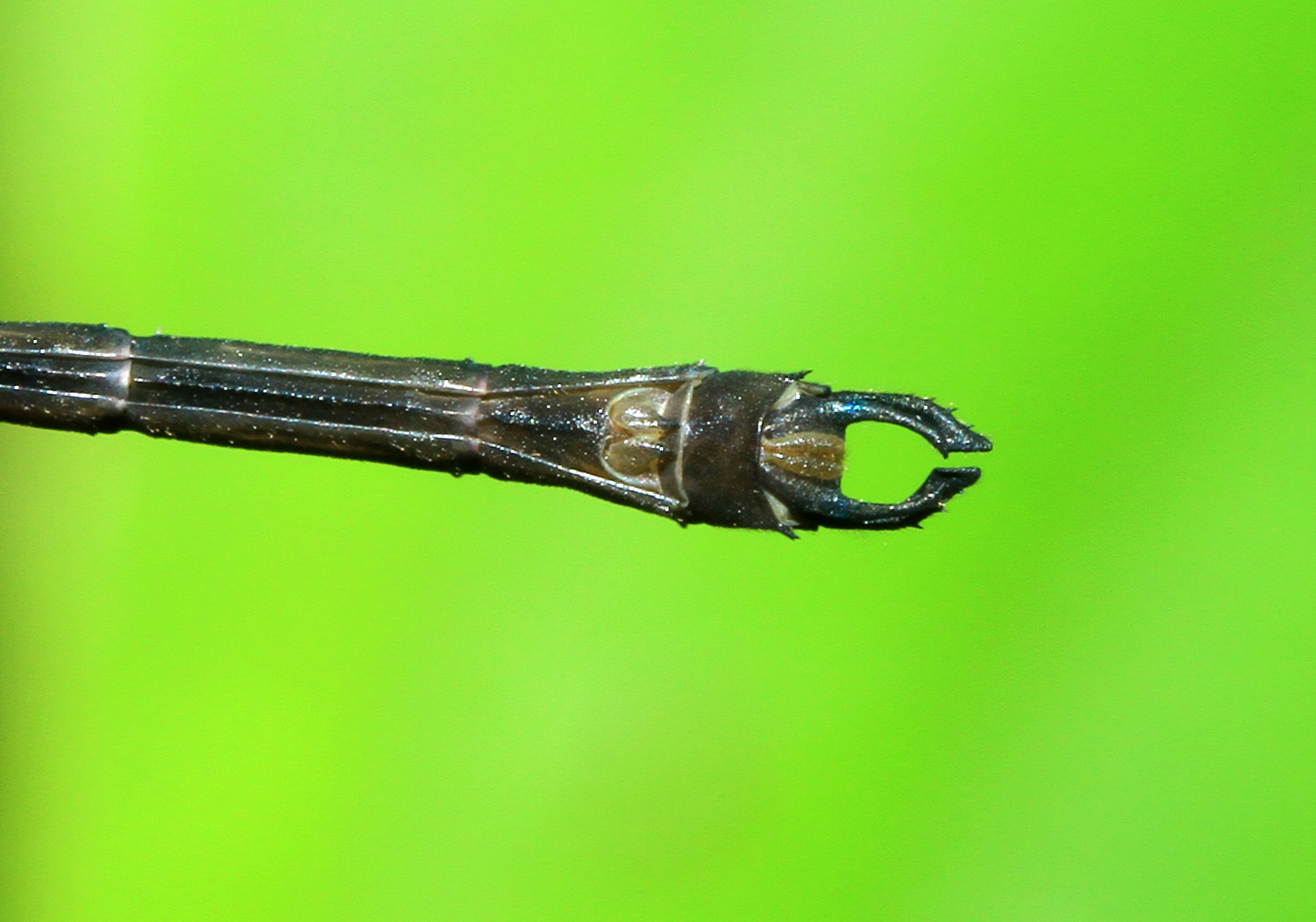
Caudal appendages of male (ventral view)

It is found in the upland forest streams in South India.

== See also ==
- Vestalis gracilis
- Vestalis apicalis
- List of odonates of India
- List of odonata of Kerala
