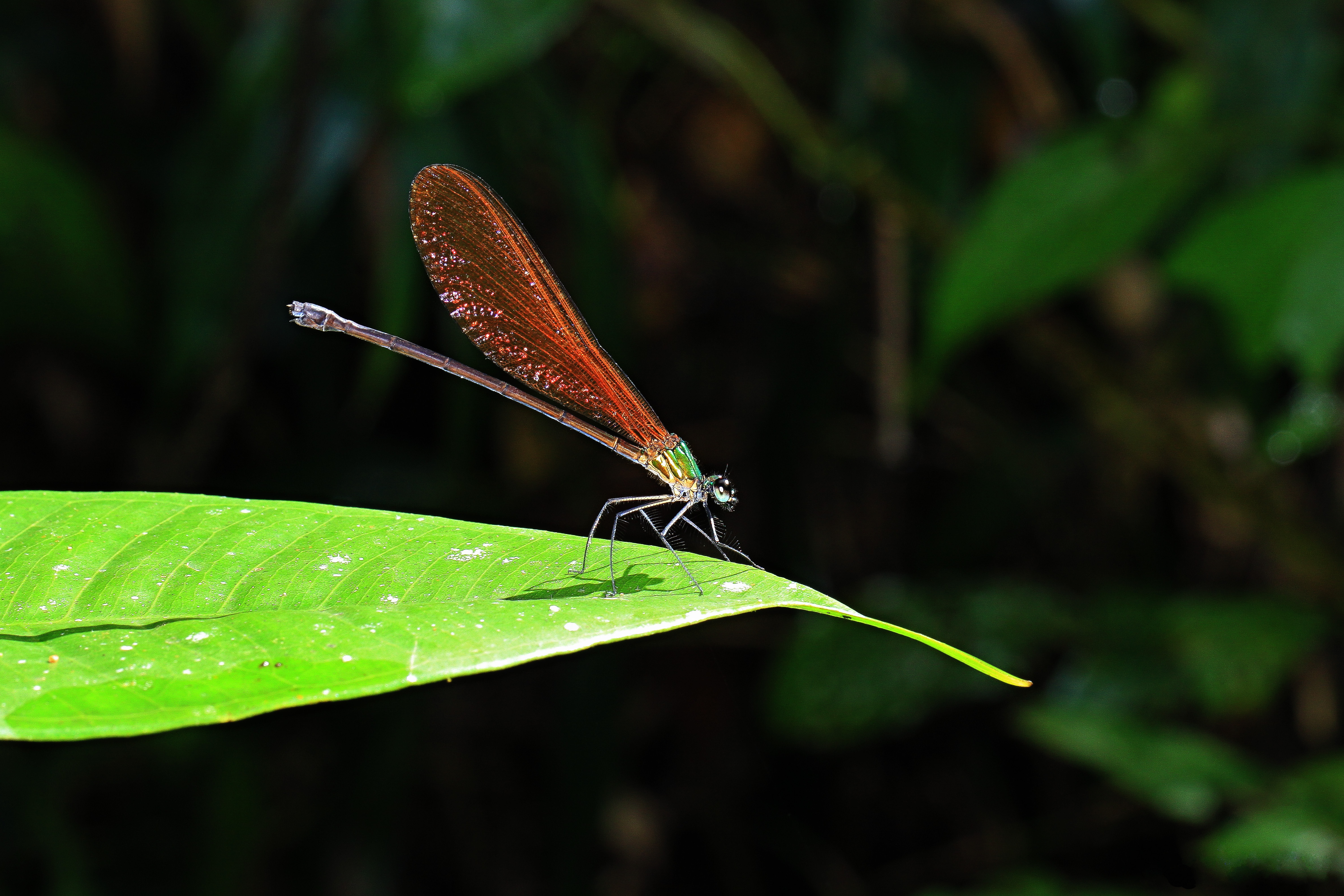
- Female

Conservation status
- Least Concern (IUCN 3.1)

Scientific classification
- Kingdom: Animalia
- Phylum: Arthropoda
- Clade: Pancrustacea
- Class: Insecta
- Order: Odonata
- Suborder: Zygoptera
- Family: Calopterygidae
- Genus: Vestalis
- Species: V. luctuosa

Binomial name
- Vestalis luctuosa Burmeister, 1839

Synonyms
- Calopteryx luctuosa Burmeister, 1839; Calopteryx formosa Rambur, 1842

= Vestalis luctuosa =

Species of damselfly

Vestalis luctuosa, also known as Nila flashwing, is a species of damselfly from the family Calopterygidae. It is endemic to Indonesia where it is found on Bali, Java, and Sumatra. It occurs near forest streams, including artificial irrigation channels.
