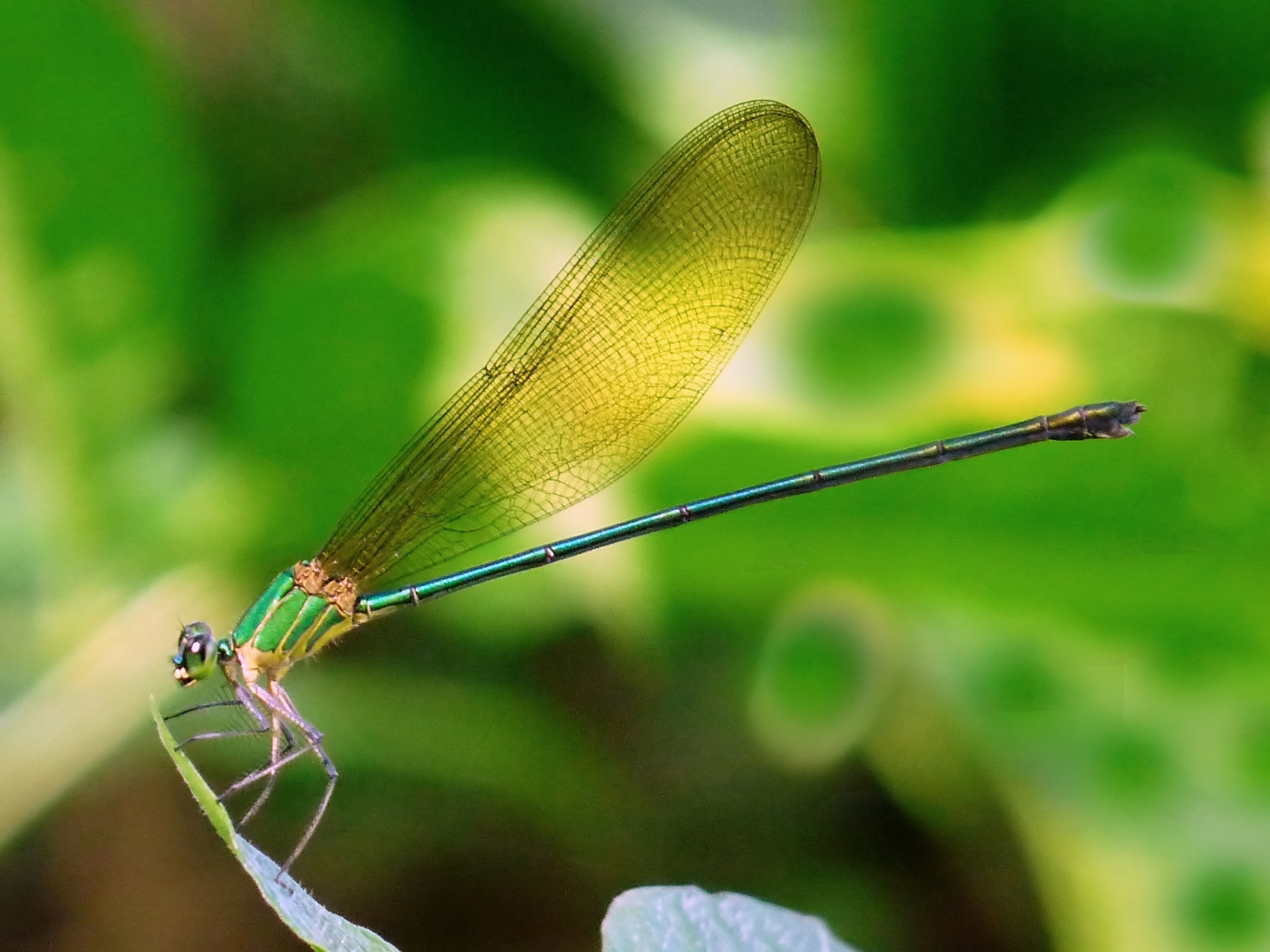
- Vestalis gracilis
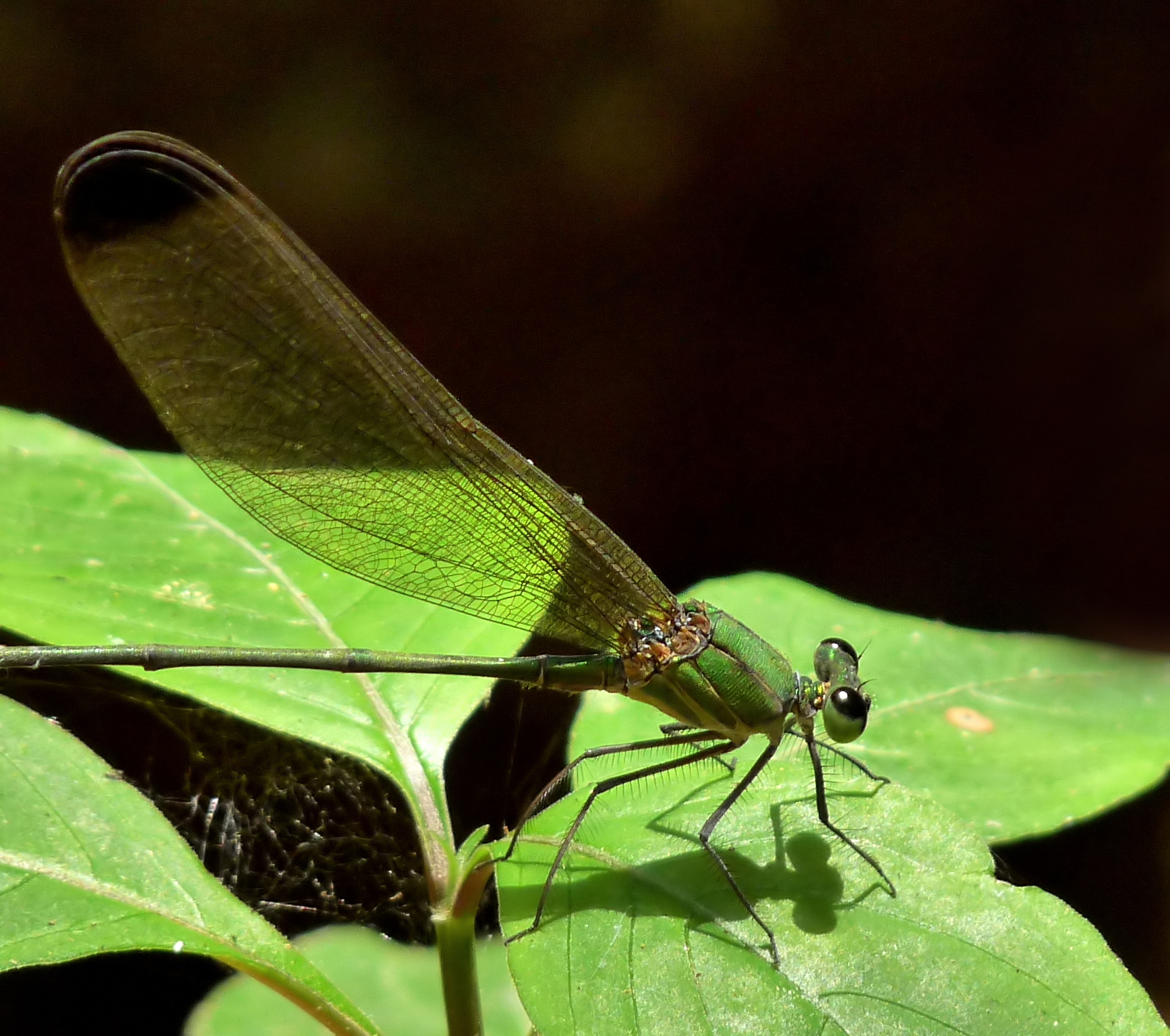
- Vestalis apicalis

Scientific classification
- Kingdom: Animalia
- Phylum: Arthropoda
- Clade: Pancrustacea
- Class: Insecta
- Order: Odonata
- Suborder: Zygoptera
- Family: Calopterygidae
- Subfamily: Calopteryginae
- Tribe: Vestalini
- Genus: Vestalis; Selys, 1853

= Vestalis =

Genus of insects

Vestalis is a genus of damselflies belonging to the family Calopterygidae.

The genus contains the following species:

- Vestalis amabilis Lieftinck, 1965
- Vestalis amaryllis Lieftinck, 1965
- Vestalis amethystina Lieftinck, 1965 – Forest Damselfly
- Vestalis amnicola Lieftinck, 1965
- Vestalis amoena Selys, 1853 – Metallic Green Demoiselle, Charming Flashwing
- Vestalis anacolosa Lieftinck, 1965
- Vestalis anne Hämäläinen, 1985
- Vestalis apicalis Selys, 1873
- Vestalis atropha Lieftinck, 1965
- Vestalis beryllae Laidlaw, 1915
- Vestalis gracilis (Rambur, 1842) – Clear-winged Forest Glory
- Vestalis luctuosa (Burmeister, 1839)
- Vestalis lugens Albarda in Selys, 1879
- Vestalis melania Selys, 1873
- Vestalis submontana Fraser, 1934
- Vestalis yunosukei Asahina, 1990
