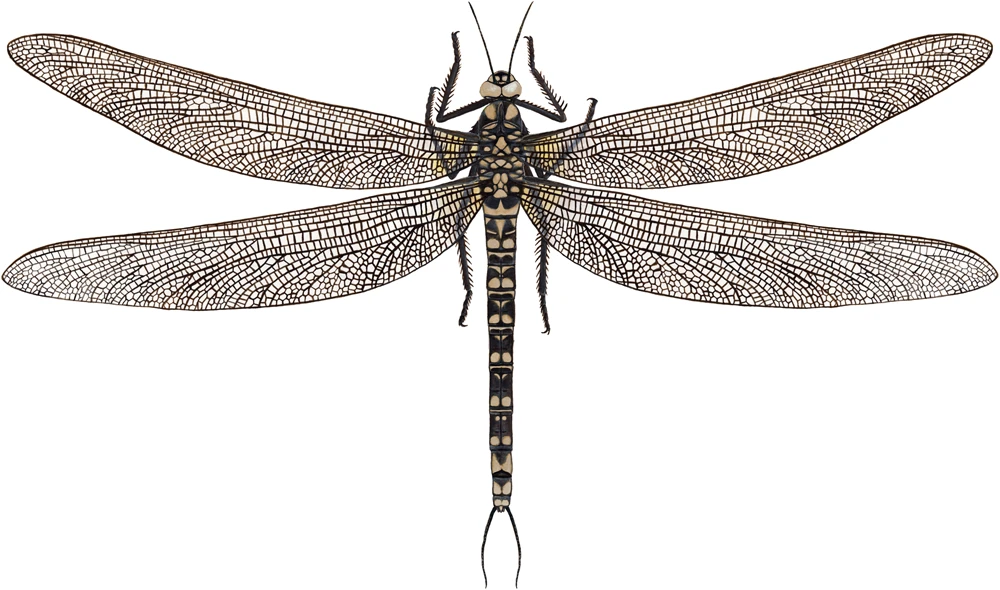
- Reconstruction of Carboniferous odonapteran Meganeurites (Meganeuridae, Meganisoptera)

Scientific classification
- Kingdom: Animalia
- Phylum: Arthropoda
- Clade: Pancrustacea
- Class: Insecta
- Infraclass: Palaeoptera
- Superorder: Odonatoptera; Lameere, 1900

Orders
- See text

Synonyms
- Campylopterodea Rohdendorf, 1962; Odonatoidea Lameere, 1936

= Odonatoptera =

Odonatoptera Temporal range: Latest Serpukhovian - Recent

Taxonomic superorder of winged insects

The Odonatoptera are a superorder (sometimes treated as an order) of ancient winged insects, placed in the probably paraphyletic group Palaeoptera. The dragonflies and damselflies (which are placed in the subgroup Odonata) are the only living members of this group, which was far more diverse in the late Paleozoic and contained gigantic species, including the griffinflies (colloquially called giant dragonflies, although they were not dragonflies in the strict sense) of the order Meganisoptera (formerly Protodonata). The oldest members of Odonatoptera are known from the latest part of the Serpukhovian age of the Early Carboniferous, about 325–324 million years ago, making them among the oldest known winged insects.

== Systematics and taxonomy ==
There is little consensus about the relationships of the Odonatoptera. What is certain is that they are a clade of winged insects that stands outside the Neoptera. But various authors' analyses have yielded any one of three mutually exclusive phylogenies, or some variant thereof: The least problematic (in a taxonomic sense) view is that the Odonatoptera are the sister taxon of the Ephemeropteroidea (the mayfly lineage), and that the Palaeodictyopteroidea are either their sister taxon or a basal assemblage, all within a monophyletic Palaeoptera. But few recent analyses have supported this. Rather, it seems more and more likely that the Odonatoptera are the sister taxon of the Neoptera, making the "Palaeoptera" paraphyletic. The third view places the mayfly lineage as sister taxon of the neopterans, with the Odonatoptera as most primitive winged insects; it has seen little support in recent decades however.

The superorder Odonatoptera includes the following major groups and families which may be considered orders (following Nel and Piney (2022)), ordered from the most basal groups downward to those closest to the Odonata crown group:

- Order †Eugeroptera (latest Early Carboniferous)
- Order †Kukaloptera (latest Early Carboniferous)
- Order †Argentinoptera (latest Early Carboniferous)
- Order †Geroptera (latest Early Carboniferous)
- Family †Enigmapteridae (Late Carboniferous)
- Order †"Eomeganisoptera" (Late Carboniferous) (paraphyletic)
- Order †Meganisoptera (Late Carboniferous – Middle Permian) – griffinflies or "giant dragonflies"
- Family †Campylopteridae (Late Carboniferous)
- Family †Lapeyriidae (Middle Permian)
- Order †Protanisoptera (Permian)
- Clade †Triadophlebioptera (Middle Permian – Late Triassic) – including orders Triadophlebiomorpha and Triadotypomorpha)
- Order †"Protozygoptera" (Late Carboniferous – Early Cretaceous) (including Archizygoptera) (paraphyletic)
- Family †Saxonagrionidae (Permian)
- Family †Huangiopteridae (Permian)
- Family †Tarsophlebiidae (Middle Jurassic – Early Cretaceous)
- Order Odonata (Late Triassic–Recent) – dragonflies and damselflies

In some treatments, the Odonata are expanded to include all the above taxa from Campylopteridae downward; this group is treated as an unranked clade Odonatoclada in the scheme used here. Where the Odonata are defined loosely, the term Odonatoidea is used instead of "Odonatoptera" (see e.g.).

=== Phylogeny ===
Based on the work of Günter Bechly, Nel et al. (2001) and Petrulevičius & Gutierrez (2016).

- Odonatoptera
  - Eugeroptera
    †Eugeropteridae
  - Palaeodonatoptera
    - Kukaloptera
      †Kirchneralidae
    - Plesiodonatoptera
      - Argentinoptera
        †Argentinalidae
      - Apodonatoptera
        - Geroptera
          †Geropteridae
        - Neodonataptera
          - †Eomeganisoptera (†Erasipteridae)
          - Euodonatoptera
            - †Meganisoptera (griffinflies)
            - Odonatoclada
              - †Lapeyriidae
              - Campylopterodea (incertae sedis)
                †Campylopteridae
              - Nodialata
                - †Protanisoptera
                - Pandiscoidalia
                  - †Triadotypomorpha
                  - Discoidalia
                    - †Triadophlebiomorpha
                    - Stigmoptera
                      - †Protozygoptera (including Archizygoptera)
                      - Panodonata
                        - Tarsophlebioptera
                          †Tarsophlebiidae
                        - Odonata
                          - Zygoptera (damselfly)
                          - Epiproctophora
                            - †Isophlebioptera
                            - Euepiproctophora
                              - Epiophlebiidae
                              - Anisopteromorpha
                                - †Erichschmidtiidae (incertae sedis)
                                - †Heterophlebioptera
                                - Trigonoptera
                                  - †Stenophlebioptera
                                  - Pananisoptera
                                    - †Liassogomphidae
                                    - †Juragomphidae
                                    - Neoanisoptera
                                      - †Aeschnidiidae
                                      - Anisoptera (dragonfly)

Cladogram of Odonatoptera including Odonata by Deregnaucourt et al. 2023.

- Odonatoptera (Odonata sensu lato)
  - †Meganisoptera
    †Meganeuridae
  - Nodialata
    - †Protanisoptera
      - †Polytaxineuridae
      - - †Permaeschnidae
        - - †Callimokaltaniidae
          - - †Hemizygopteridae
            - †Ditaxineuridae
    - Discoidalia
      - †Triadophlebiomorpha
        - †Iverya
        - - †Pirouteliidae
          - - †Kargalotypidae
            - †Zygophlebiida
              - †Zygophlebiidae
              - †Moltenophlebiidae
              - - †Permophlebiidae
                - †Xamenophlebiidae
            - †Triadophlebiida
              - †Triassologus
              - †Sinotriadophlebiidae
              - †Mitophlebiidae
              - - †Paurophlebiidae
                - †Triadophlebiidae
      - Stigmoptera
        - †Permagrionidae
        - - †Archizygoptera
            - †Bakteniidae
            - †Kennedyidae
            - †Oboraneuridae
            - †Kaltanoneuridae
            - †Lodeviidae
            - †Luiseiidae
            - †Permepallagidae
            - - †Voltzialestidae
              - †Terskejoptera
                - †Terskeja
                - - †Protomyrmeleontidae
                  - †Moltenagrionidae
          - Panodonata
            - †Triassolestidae (in part)
            - Lobodonata
              - †Mesophlebiidae
              - †Triassolestidae (in part)
              - - †Tarsophlebiidae
                - Odonata (crown group)
                  - Zygoptera (damselflies)
                  - Epiproctophora
                    - - †Euthemistidae
                      - †Selenothemistidae
                      - - †Archithemistidae
                        - - †Campterophlebiidae
                          - †Isophlebiidae
                      - - †Sphenophlebiidae
                        - - †Asiopteridae
                          - †Cyclothemistidae
                    - - †Erichschmidtiidae
                      - - †Liassostenophlebiidae
                        - - †Prostenophlebiidae
                          - †Stenophlebiidae
                      - - †Myopophlebiidae
                        - - †Heterophlebiidae
                          - - †Liassophlebiidae
                            - †Parastenophlebiidae
                      - - †Juragomphidae
                        - †Liassogomphidae
                        - - †Aeschnidiidae
                          - Anisoptera (modern dragonflies)
