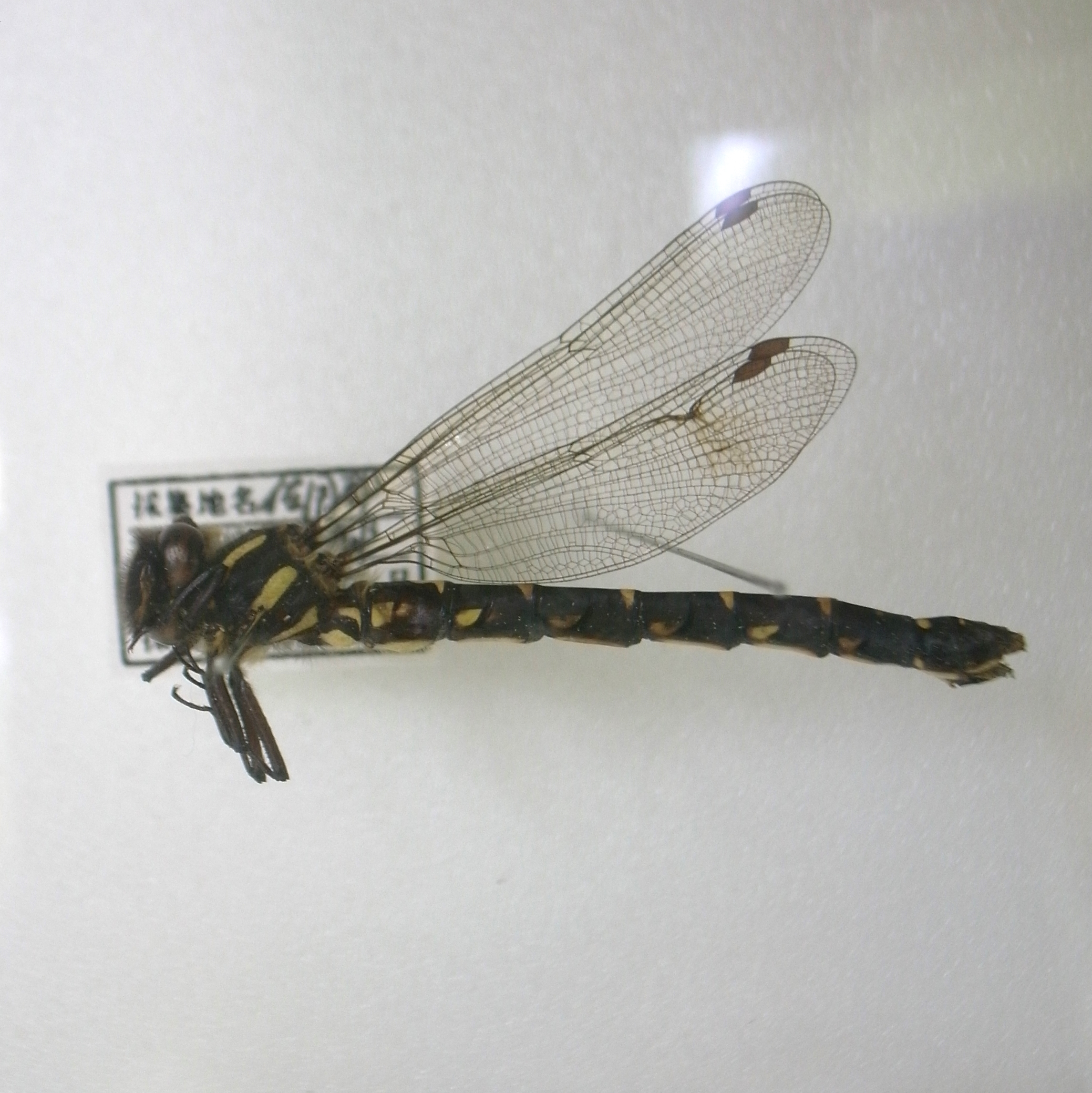

Scientific classification
- Kingdom: Animalia
- Phylum: Arthropoda
- Clade: Pancrustacea
- Class: Insecta
- Order: Odonata
- Suborder: Anisozygoptera
- Family: Epiophlebiidae
- Genus: Epiophlebia
- Species: E. superstes

Binomial name
- Epiophlebia superstes (Sélys, 1889)
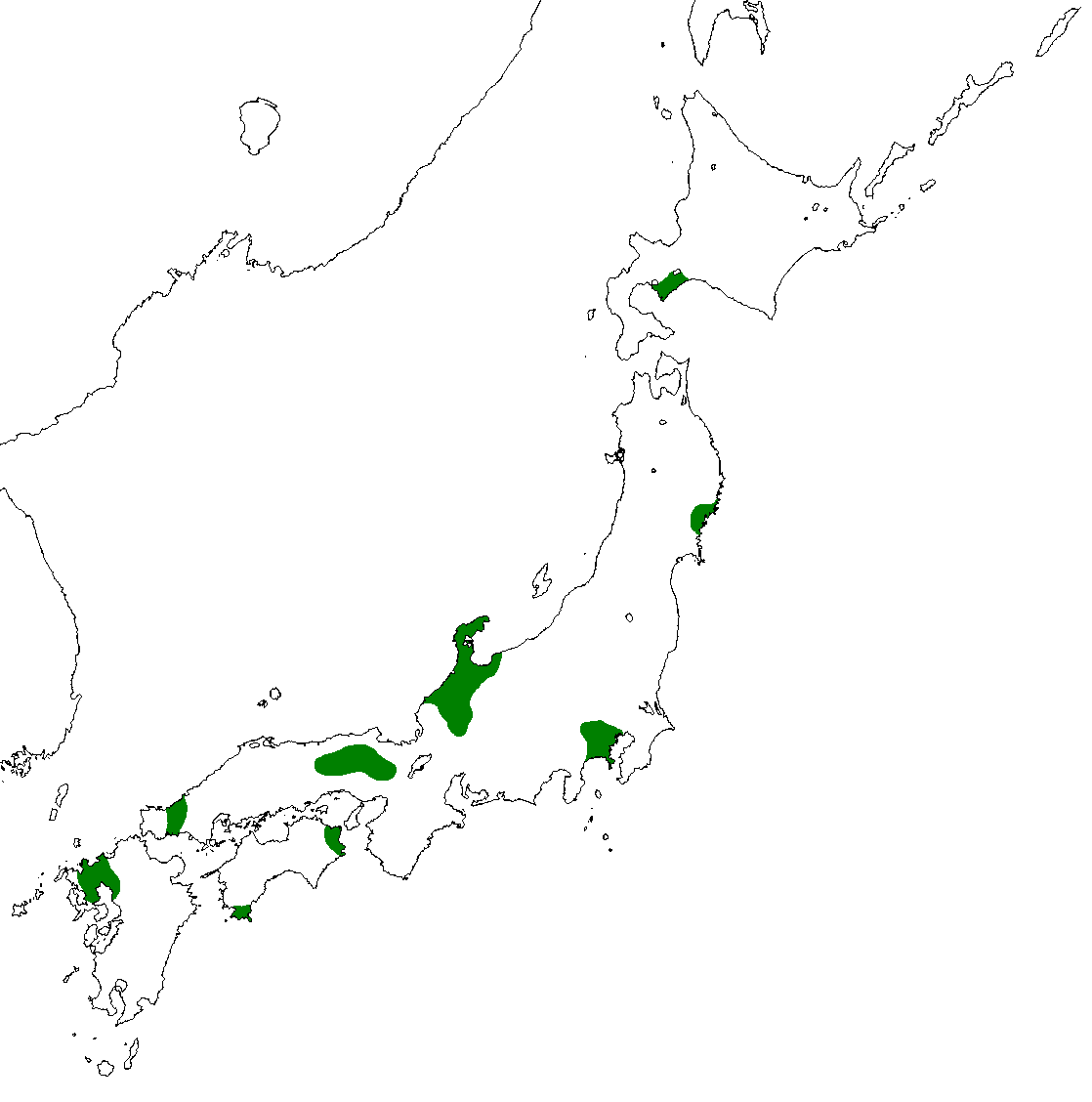
- Range of Epiophlebia superstes

= Epiophlebia superstes =

Species of odonate

Epiophlebia superstes, the Japanese relict dragonfly, is a species of odonate in the family Epiophlebiidae. It is one of three recognised species of Epiophlebia, the only living genus in the suborder Anisozygoptera. The species is endemic to Japan, where it occurs around forested river headwaters on the country's four main islands.

== Distribution and habitat ==
This species of dragonfly is native to Japan, distributing widely around the forested headwaters of rivers in its four main islands, serving as a freshwater indicator of ecosystem health. With the adults being adapted for flight in these cool habitats, and the larvae to exploit the stable environment and detritus based ecosystems of high elevation spring-fed seeps and streams.

Its flight period lasts about one month in length, but varies significantly through the diverse altitudes and latitudes of Japan, extending from late March in Kyushu to July in Hokkaido, for example, in the Kinki area, the flight period of Epiophlebia superstes extends from the end of April to mid-June.

== Taxonomy ==
Edmond de Sélys Longchamps described the species in 1889 as Palaeophlebia superstes. The generic name Palaeophlebia had already been used by Friedrich Moritz Brauer for a fossil odonate, so Philip Powell Calvert proposed Epiophlebia as a replacement name in 1903. The parentheses around Sélys's name in the scientific authority indicate this later transfer to a different genus. "Superstes" is a Latin word meaning "survivor", which seems to tie into the idea of its relictuality.

Tillyard treated Epiophlebia superstes and Epiophlebia laidlawi as members of Anisozygoptera in 1921. Current classifications retain Epiophlebia as the only living genus of that suborder. Molecular studies recover the genus as the sister group of Anisoptera, the dragonflies.

== Description and keys for identification ==
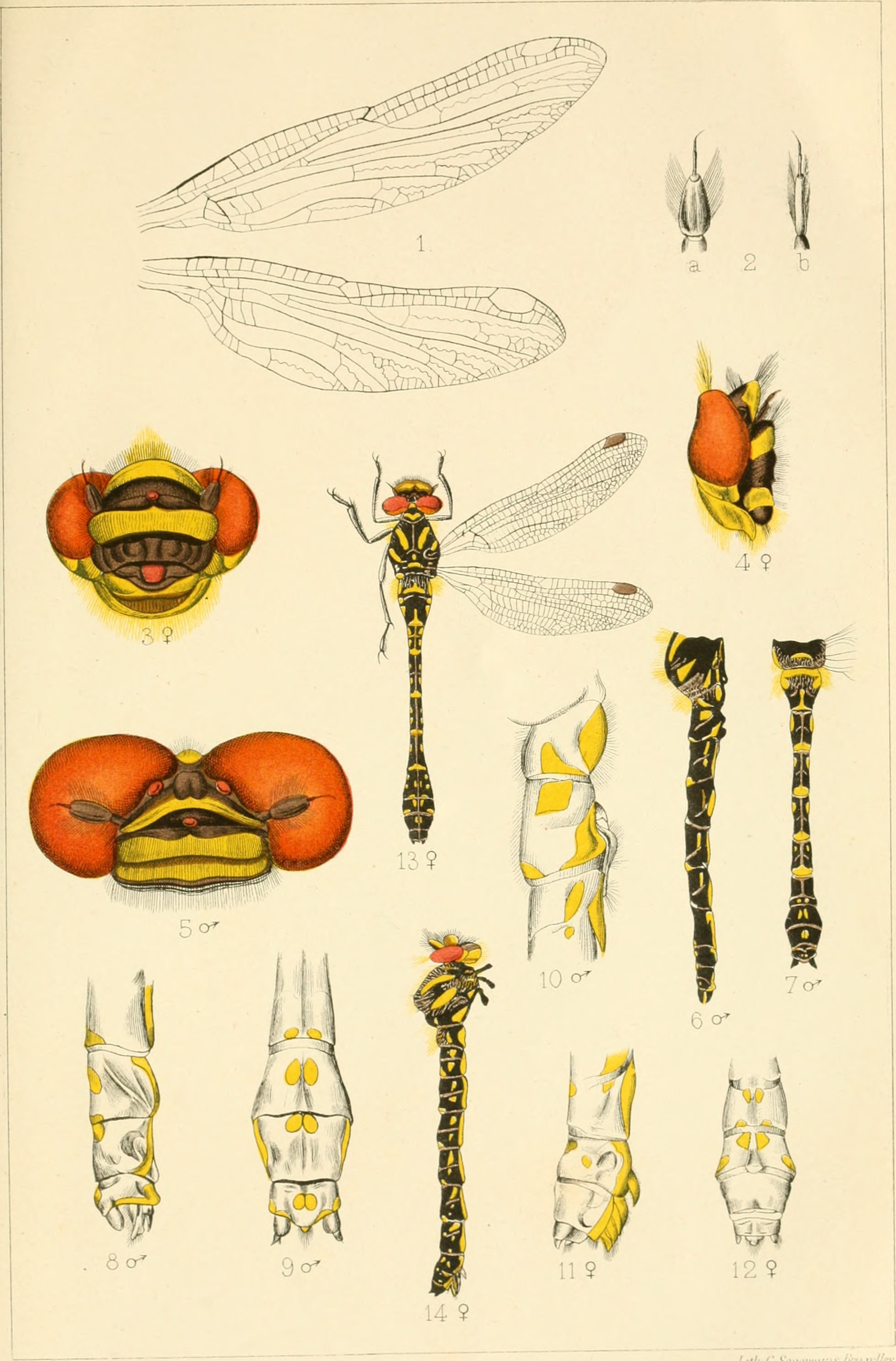
Morphological description of Epiophlebia superstes in Annales de la Société entomologique de Belgique (1888)

=== Adults ===
Length in adult Epiophlebia superstes ranges from 45 mm to 53 mm. Its body is black, striped in bright yellow on both the thorax and abdomen.

They present a genae with lateral tubercles, their labrum widens distally, and the antennae are segmented with composed segments. Epiophlebia superstes presents an elongated and flattened pedicel, postfrons with transverse shield-like intraocellar ridge, antitandem lobes in the male occipital lobes, male epiproct with ventral and dorsal rami, male gonocoxae elongate and the 8th female abdominal segment with midventral apical spur.

The copulatory apparatus of Epiophlebia includes a pair of elongated and posteriorly directed hamuli with bloated studded hooked apices and a median process of abdominal sternum two, as well as a somewhat bottle shaped sperm vesicle that can be found at the 3rd abdominal sternum. The ovipositor of the females shares a lot of characteristics with zygopterans, with setae and sensilia which are in egg laying, assessing the suitability of the leave they are on and being responsible for the zigzag pattern of its egg disposition.

Some plesiomorphic character states are the following: labial end hook occasionally two-segmented (not as usual as one-segmented), well developed glossae and paraglossae, and a trilobate hypopharynx.

To distinguish Epiophlebia superstes from the rest of its genre we have to observe the 6th abdominal segment, laterally beyond antecostal suture, and segments 7–10 and terminalia ferruginous, with dorsal pale spots of segments 8–10 obscure.

==== Wing features ====
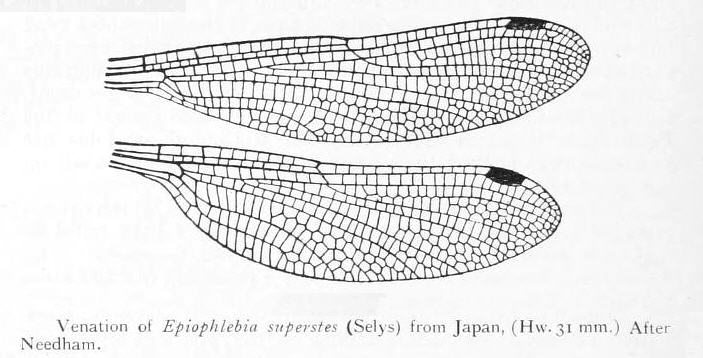
Wing venation of E. superstes

The petiole of the hind wing is well-developed, the costal is widened at nodus, the pterostigmata are strongly convexed posteriorly, and the hind wings present one or two cell rows between the CuA and the wing margin. Epiophlebia also lacks a discal nodus, an often overlooked ventral membranous area along the discal brace, yet some wing flexibility is achieved by a slight flattening of the pleat at the discal brace, and although the costal nodus is hinge-like its flexibility is limited particularly in the forewings by a minimal nodal fissure. E. superstes can be divided up into two forms according to the type of formation of arculus found in the hind-wings, with one of the forms displaying clearly the process of passage from the Zygoptera to Anisoptera marked by the division of the discoidal cell into upper and lower cells, making the hind wings similar in shape and size to the forewings.

=== Larvae ===
Epiophlebia larvae are unique because their antennae have 5 segments, the head has observable paralabial ridges, and they are capable of producing sounds when they rub the inner apex of the femora against the files on the sides of the abdomen. Plesiomorphic character states of Epiophlebia larvae include wing pads without a branch of the RA tracheae crossing over the RP trachea, abdomen without transverse muscles, simple rectal gills, and proventriculus with 16 to 18 well-developed denticulate lobes. Epiophlebia is also unique because they present the most ancient thoracic morphology among Odonata, with 75 muscles identified in its thorax, which is the most ever found in any odonate.

== Life history and behaviour ==
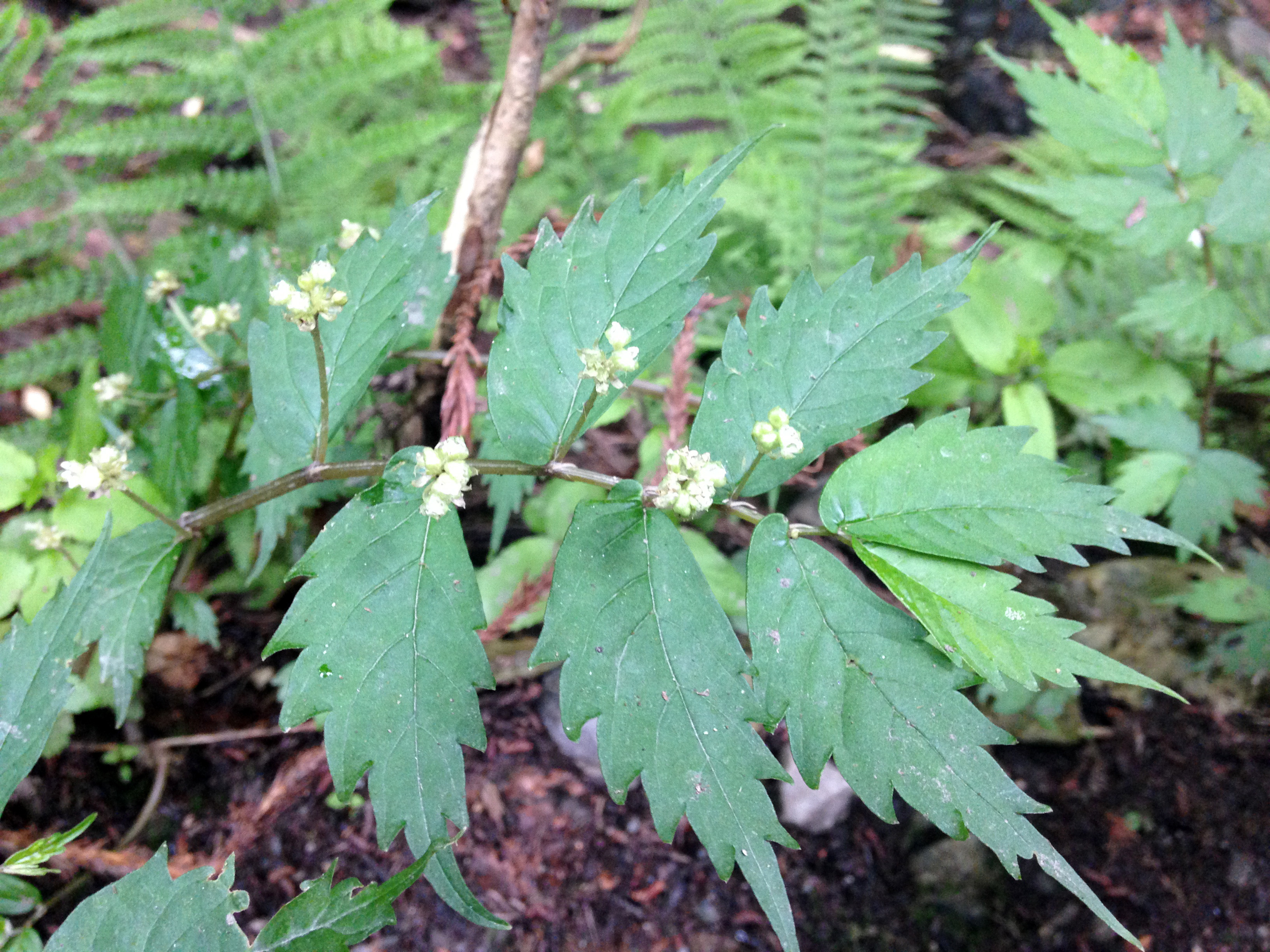
Elatostema umbellatum

=== Oviposition ===
The female oviposits on the stem of a variety of soft tissued plants typically growing in wet and shaded areas, less than one meter from the river stream, these include a wide variety of species, like Elatostema umbellatum. Once standing on the place of oviposition, she rises her abdomen in an arc while maintaining its ovipositor in contact with the stalk and starts testing the plant with trial thrusts while descending in the stem, if the surface proves too solid she will fly away, but if the plant is adequate she will start laying eggs in the bottom of the stem while moving slowly from left to right, and then returning from right to left. She repeats this action while also slowly ascending in the stem until she finishes the oviposition of up to a thousand eggs, producing a distinguishable zigzag pattern of scars along the surface of the stalk.

=== Embryonic development ===
Eggs are about 1/4 as wide as long, and average 1.1 mm in length. The embryo of this species presents visible micropyles, specially during the middle period of embryo development, they are lined up in a circle around the anterior end of the subapical ring and are numerous compared to other dragonflies, with 10 to 15 pieces per individual (an average of 12.7).

The egg period at an average temperature 27.1 °C is eighteen days, at 25.5 °C, it is 20 days, and at 20 °C, it is 30 days.

=== Egg-parasitoid wasps ===
Myrmaridae wasps are common parasites of the eggs of Epiophlebia superstes. Female wasps walk around the surface of the plant investigating it with their antennas, upon finding an egg to parasite, the wasp situates her ovipositor vertical to the surface of the plant and pushes it, piercing the egg of Epiophlebia superstes and laying her own eggs inside. The growth of the parasite is fast, quickly turning into the pupal stage and emerging in just a few days, much earlier than the hatching of the unparasitized eggs. With adult wasps starting to reproduce and lay eggs soon after their emergence.

Infected dragonfly eggs are easily distinguished from uninfected ones, as instead of their usual white color, they present the distinct coloring of the parasite in its pupal state, which is mostly yellow, darkening into black and red colors during its later stages.

=== Hatching and prolarval stage ===
The shrimp-like prolarva has a sharp tail edge and needs around 120 seconds to exit the egg, emerging from the plant, to then jump off the plant and into the water. Several minutes after reaching the water surface, after a period longer than that of most other dragonflies, the prolarval exuvia is cast and the first instar larva sinks to the stream bed.

=== Larval stage ===
The first instar larva presents a body length of 1.24 mm, a head width of 0.40 mm and an antennal length of 0.21 mm. The instar presents a lifestyle similar to other dragonflies and will continue growing throughout the different larval stages until reaching maturity. This larval stage lasts five to eight years.

During early larval development, Epiophlebia superstes is specialized in moving in faster currents.

== Gallery ==
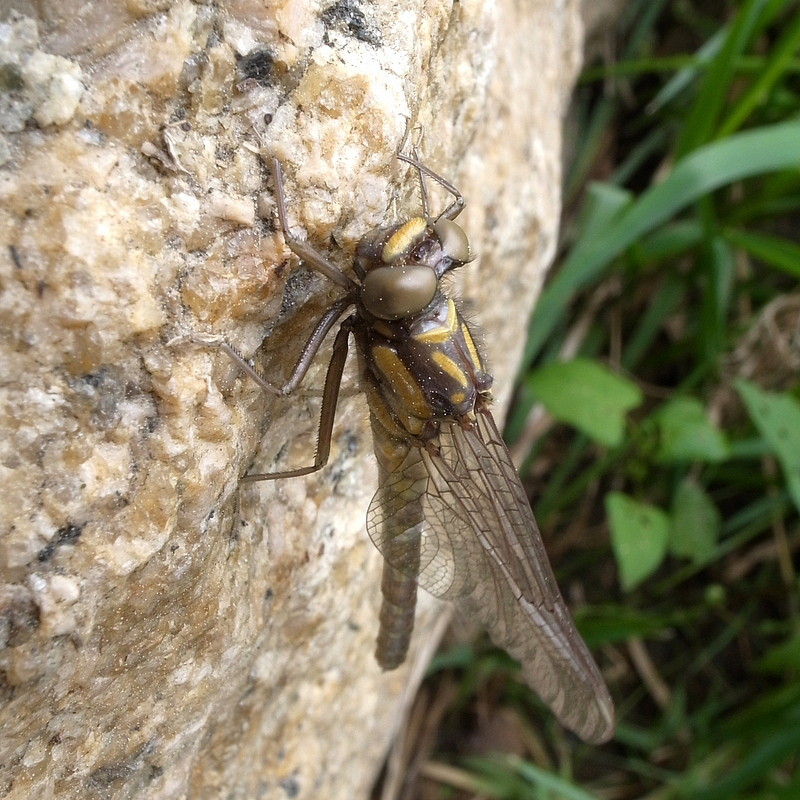
Epiophlebia superstes standing on a rock

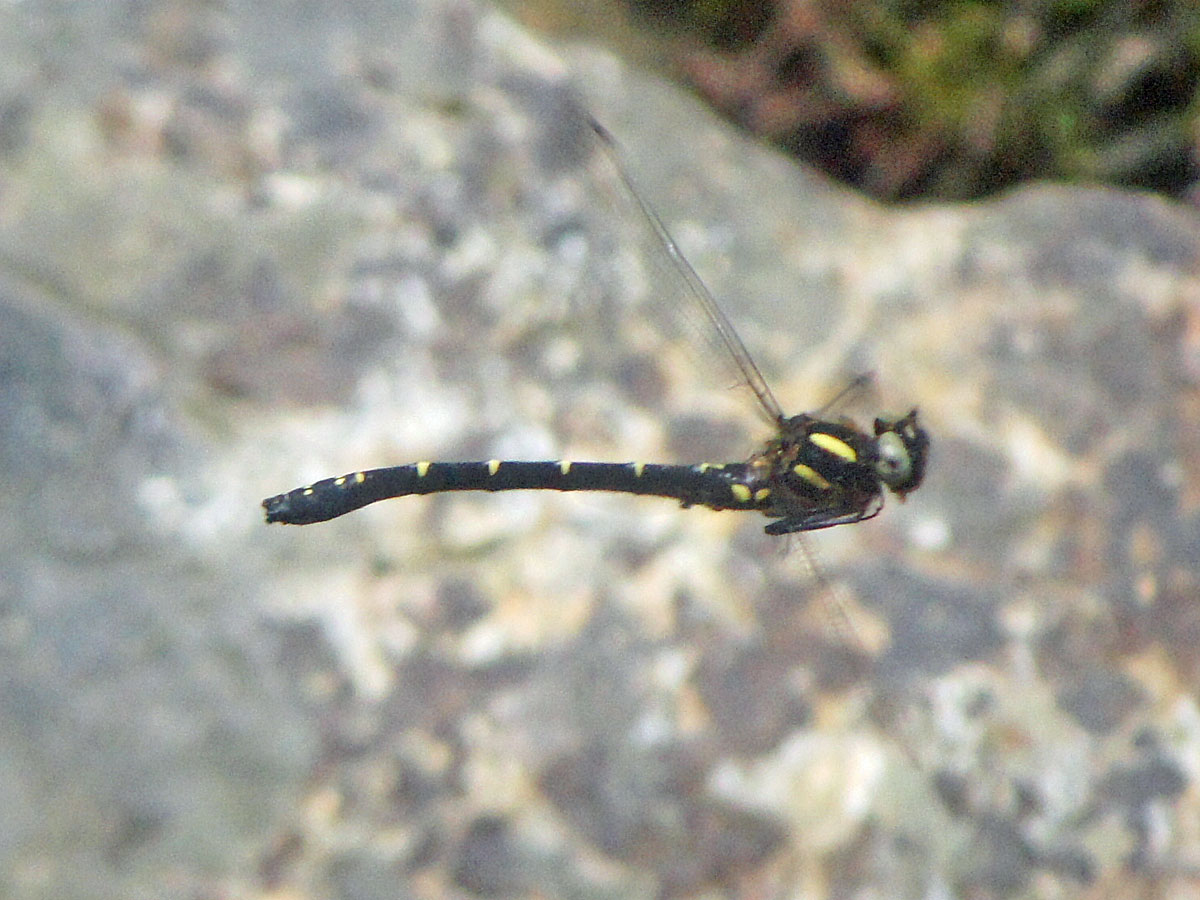
Epiophlebia superstes flying
