= Epiophlebia sinensis =

Conservation status
- Data Deficient (IUCN 3.1)

Scientific classification
- Kingdom: Animalia
- Phylum: Arthropoda
- Clade: Pancrustacea
- Class: Insecta
- Order: Odonata
- Suborder: Anisozygoptera
- Family: Epiophlebiidae
- Genus: Epiophlebia
- Species: E. sinensis

Binomial name
- Epiophlebia sinensis Li & Nel, 2012
- Distribution of Epiophlebia sinensis

Species of odonate

Epiophlebia sinensis is a species of odonate in the family Epiophlebiidae. It was described in 2012 from two adult males collected beside a cold mountain stream in Heilongjiang, northeastern China. Another male was found in Ryanggang Province, North Korea, in 2012. Very little is known about the species' distribution, population or ecology, and it was assessed as Data Deficient on the IUCN Red List in 2022.

== Taxonomy ==
Epiophlebia sinensis was described by Jing-Ke Li and André Nel in 2012, in a paper written with five other authors. The description was based on two adult male specimens collected on 20–21 June 2010 near Zheng-nan-gou stream in Wuchang, Heilongjiang. Later in 2012, Frank Louis Carle placed it with Epiophlebia superstes in the nominotypical subgenus Epiophlebia.

The status of Epiophlebia sinensis as a distinct species was questioned by Yang and colleagues in 2025, although they did not revise its taxonomic status. The World Odonata List continues to recognise Epiophlebia sinensis as a separate species.

== Description ==
Epiophlebia sinensis has a predominantly black thorax marked with yellow stripes and spots. The wings are transparent, with black pterostigmata. Abdominal segments three to five are dark brown with relatively small yellow markings, while segments six to ten are rusty brown. The head is principally reddish brown, black and yellow.

The holotype measures 52 mm (2.0 in) in total length, with an abdomen 40 mm (1.6 in) long and forewings 31 mm (1.2 in) long. The male from North Korea is slightly smaller, measuring 47 mm (1.9 in), with an abdomen 41 mm (1.6 in) long and hindwings 31 mm (1.2 in) long.

The species is distinguished from other members of Epiophlebia by its abdominal coloration and features of the male secondary genitalia and terminal appendages. The female and larval stages were not included in the original description.

== Distribution and habitat ==
Epiophlebia sinensis is known from northeastern China and North Korea. The two specimens used in the original description were collected at Zheng-nan-gou stream in the Changbai Mountains, near Wuchang in Heilongjiang, at an elevation of approximately 350 to 500 m. A third male was collected from a tributary of the Sohongdan River, about 5 km northeast of Lake Samjiyon in Ryanggang Province, North Korea, at an elevation of 1380 m.

The Chinese locality is a small, cold stream flowing through mixed broadleaf and coniferous forest. Its bed consists principally of sand and pebbles, with little mud. The stream is considered a possible larval habitat, although no larvae were collected there. The North Korean locality is also in a mountainous area with mixed broadleaf and coniferous forest. The gap between the two known localities suggests that the species may also occur in eastern and southeastern Jilin.

== Conservation ==
The International Union for Conservation of Nature assessed Epiophlebia sinensis as Data Deficient in 2022. The species has been reported from only two widely separated localities, and little is known about its distribution, population size or population trend. The IUCN assessment found that there was insufficient information to determine its risk of extinction and identified further research into its distribution, population, habitat and possible threats as necessary.

== Etymology ==
The genus name Epiophlebia was derived by Philip Powell Calvert from the Greek ἐπίων, meaning “coming after” or “following”, and φλέψ (genitive φλεβός), meaning “vein”.

The specific name sinensis refers to the species' distribution in China.
