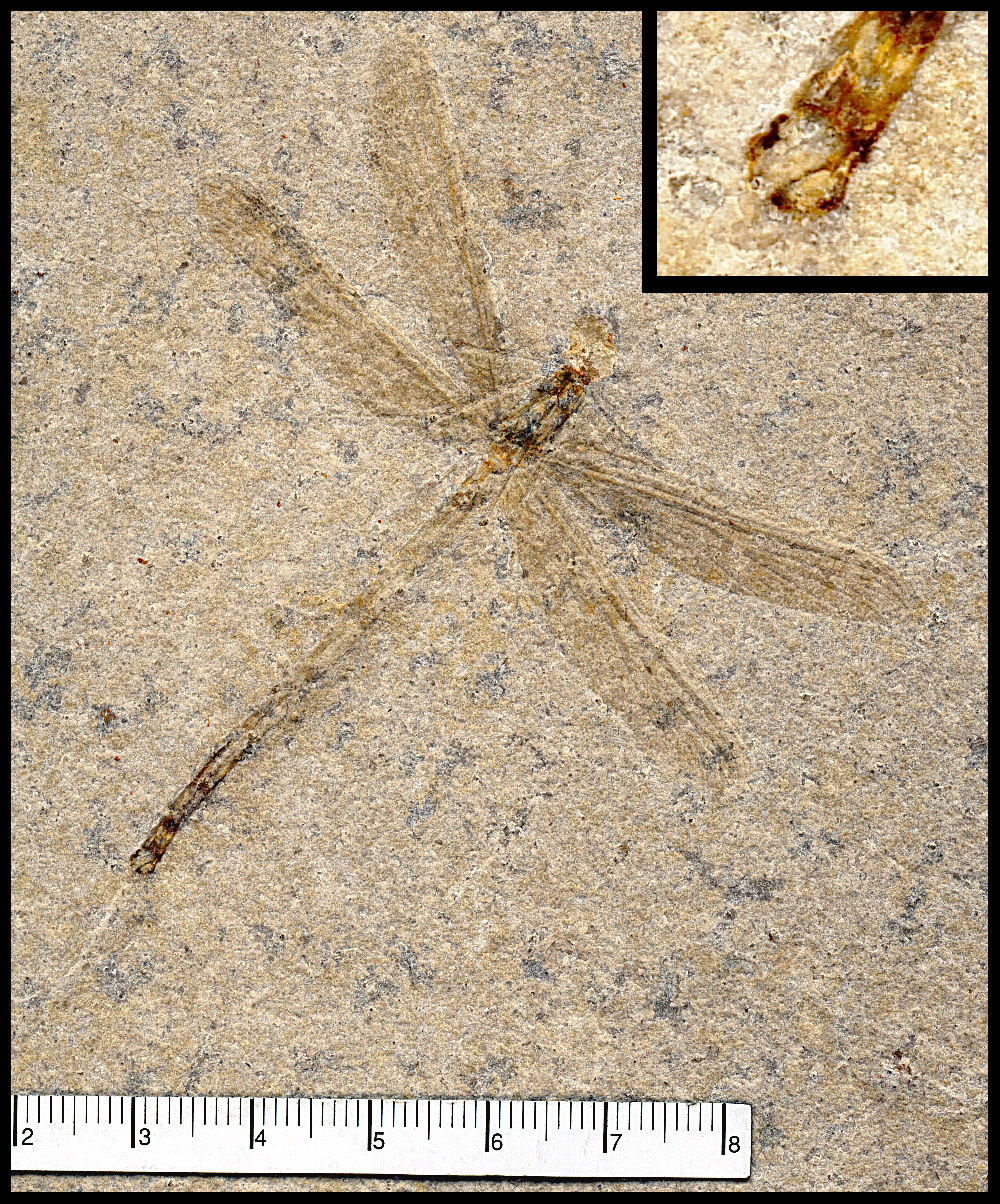
- Tarsophlebia eximia, Upper Jurassic, Solnhofen Plattenkalk

Scientific classification
- Kingdom: Animalia
- Phylum: Arthropoda
- Clade: Pancrustacea
- Class: Insecta
- Order: Odonata
- Suborder: †Tarsophlebioptera
- Family: †Tarsophlebiidae; Handlirsch, 1906

Type genus
- Tarsophlebia Hagen, 1866

Genera
- †Tarsophlebia (synonym: Tarsophlebiopsis); †Turanophlebia

= Tarsophlebiidae =

Tarsophlebiidae Temporal range: 163–121 Ma Upper Jurassic - Lower Cretaceous

Extinct family of flying insects

The Tarsophlebiidae is an extinct family of medium-sized fossil odonates from the Upper Jurassic and Lower Cretaceous period of Eurasia. They are either the most basal member of the damsel-dragonfly grade ("anisozygopteres") within the stem group of Anisoptera, or the sister group of all Recent odonates. They are characterized by the basally open discoidal cell in both pairs of wings, very long legs, paddle-shaped male cerci, and a hypertrophied ovipositor in females.

== Description ==
=== Adult ===
==== Body ====
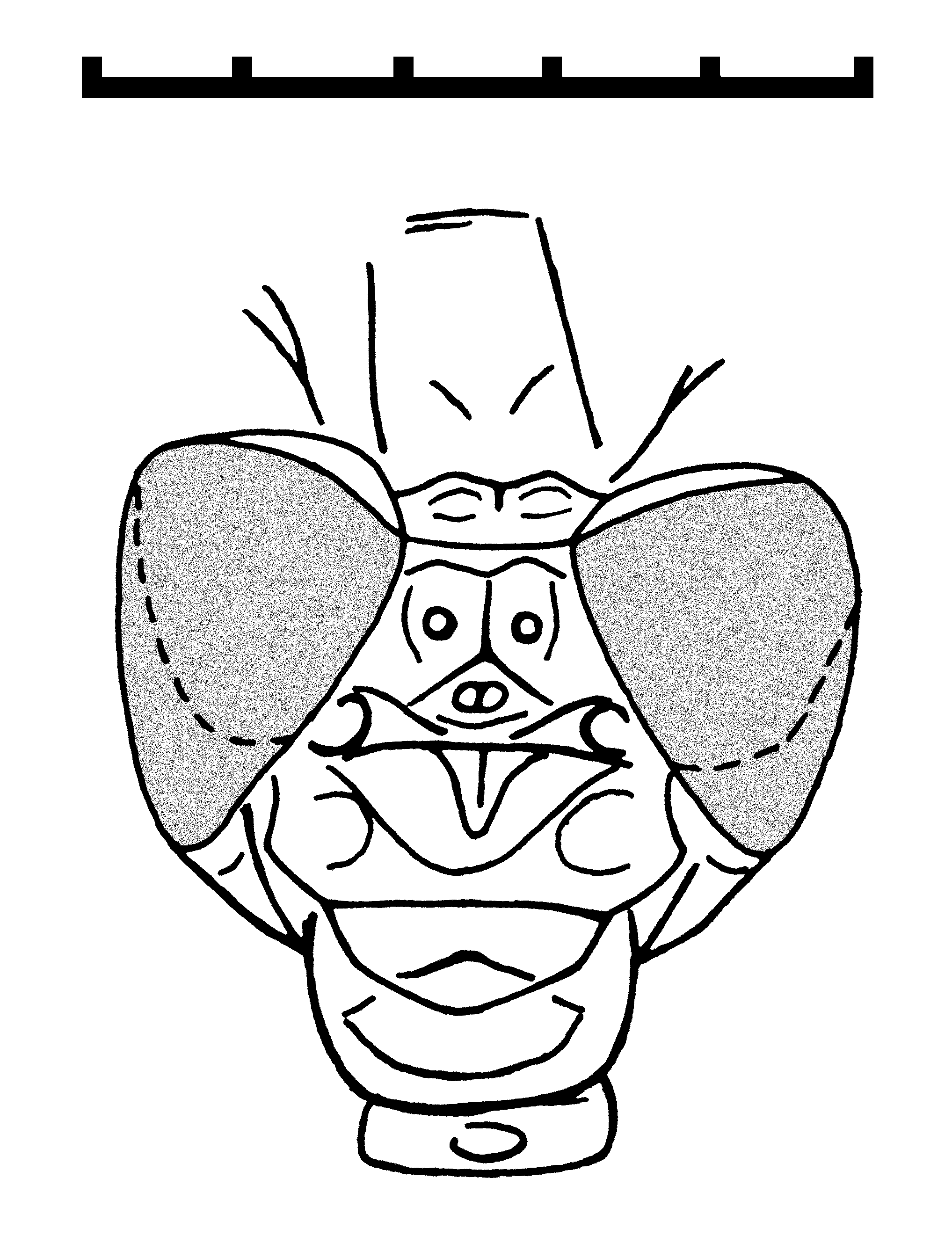
Tarsophlebia eximia, Upper Jurassic, Solnhofen Plattenkalk, head of male specimen MCZ 6129

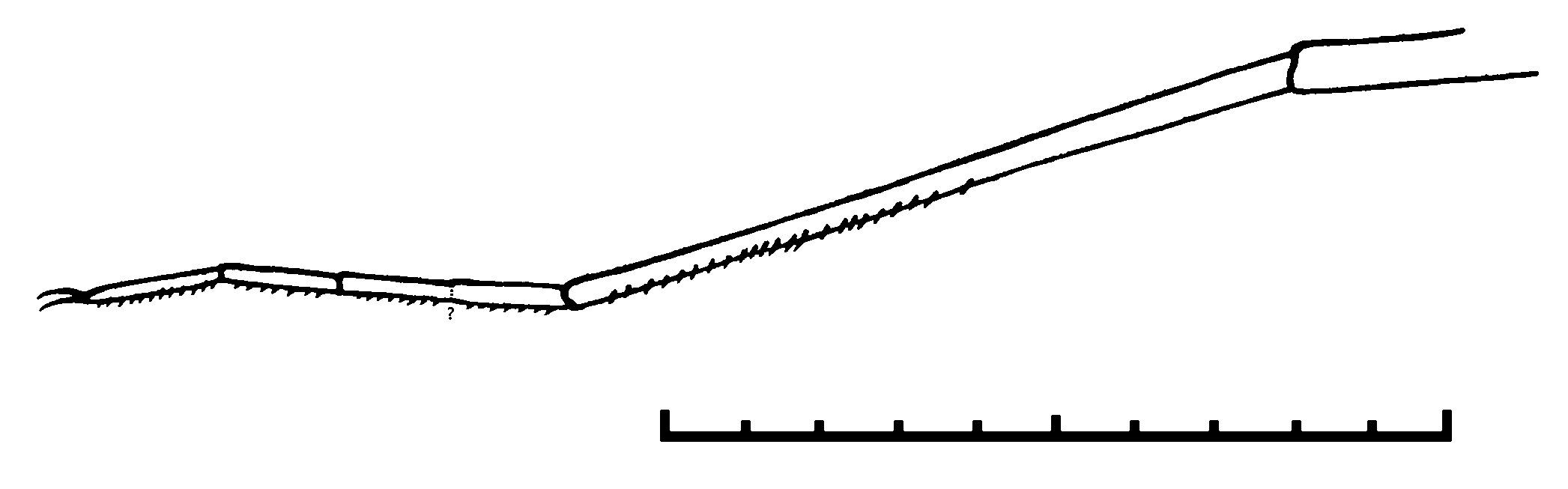
Tarsophlebia eximia, Upper Jurassic, Solnhofen Plattenkalk, right hindleg of holotype

The head is similar to that of Recent Gomphidae with two large and globular compound eyes that are distinctly separated, but closer together than in damselflies (Zygoptera). There are also two cephalic sutures.
The pterothorax seems to be even more strongly skewed than in damselflies. The legs are extremely long with short and strong spines, and with very elongate tarsi. There are three tarsal segments (tarsomeres), of which the most basal one is twice as long as the others. The pair of tarsal claws lack the ventro-apical hook of modern odonates.

==== Wings and wing venation ====
The largest species Turanophlebia sinica reached a wingspan of about 10.3 centimetres (4.1 in), while the smallest species Tarsophlebia minor reached only a wingspan of about 5.5 centimetres (2.2 in).

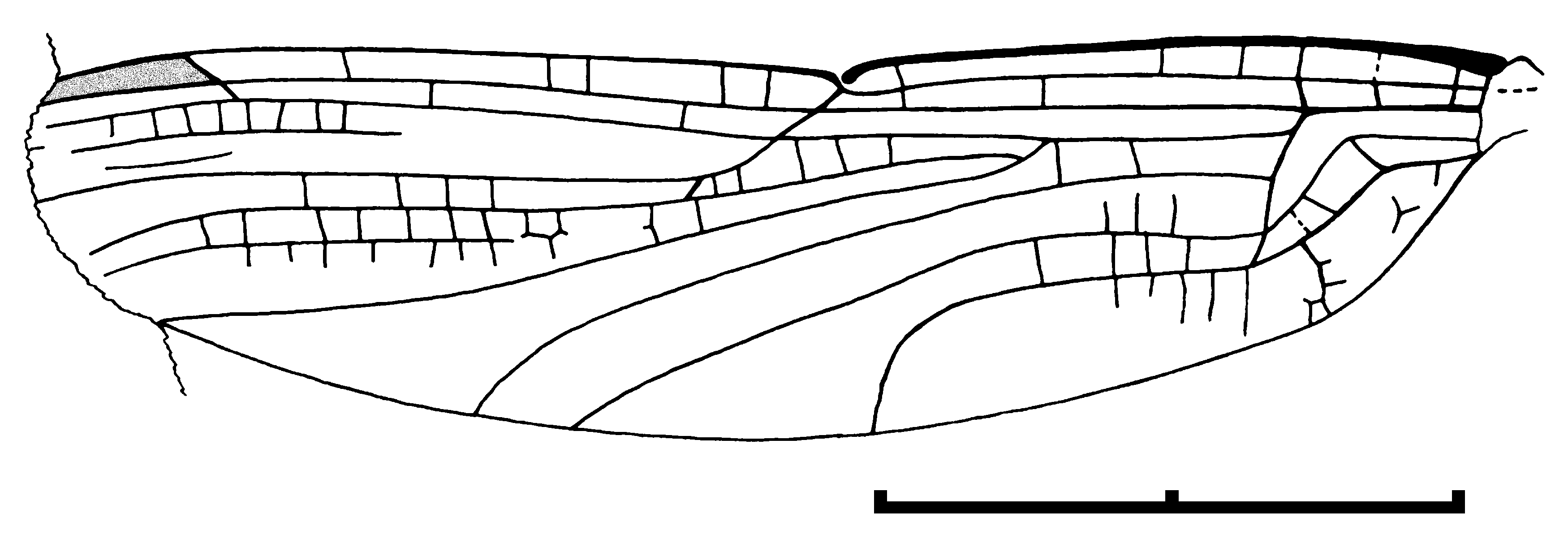
Tarsophlebia minor, Upper Jurassic, Solnhofen Plattenkalk, hindwing of holotype, scale 10 mm

The wing venation is characterized by the following features:
wings hyaline, slender, and not stalked; discoidal cell basally open in both pairs of wings, so that the arculus is incomplete; forewing discoidal cell very acute; large and acute subdiscoidal cell in hindwing; primary antenodal braces Ax1 and Ax2 stronger than the secondary antenodal crossveins; nodus in distal position at 44-47% of wing length; nodus with terminal kink of CP and a strong nodal furrow; pterostigma elongate (covering several cells) and with oblique brace vein; one lestine oblique vein 'O' present between RP2 and IR2; in all wings there are pairs of secondary longitudinal concave intercalary veins anterior and posterior of the convex veins CuA, MA, and IR2, and closely parallel to them (the postero-intercalaries are always longer than the associated antero-intercalaries); hindwings without vein CuAb; crossvein-like remnant of vein CuP is curved and rather looks like a branch of AA.

==== Sexual dimorphism ====
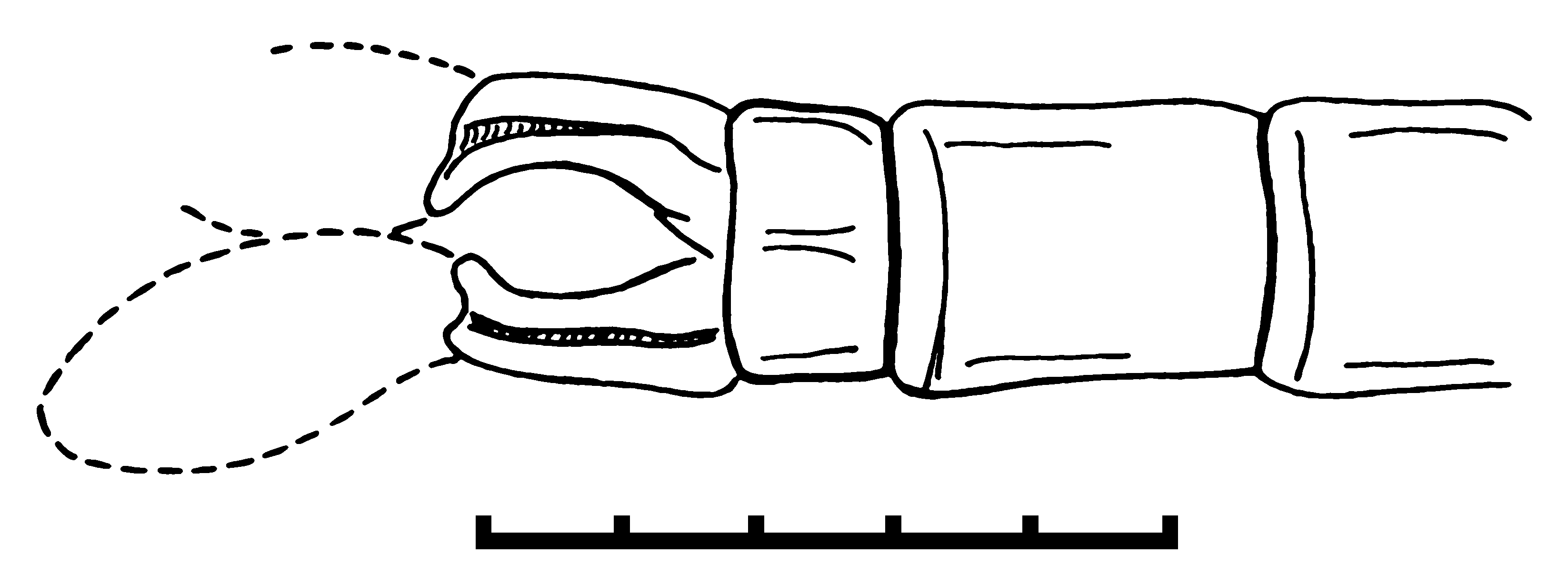
Tarsophlebia eximia, Upper Jurassic, Solnhofen Plattenkalk, cerci of male specimen MCZ 6222

Males are distinguished by paddle-like cerci, while females are distinguished by very long and thin, hypertrophied ovipositor that projects far beyond the abdomen.

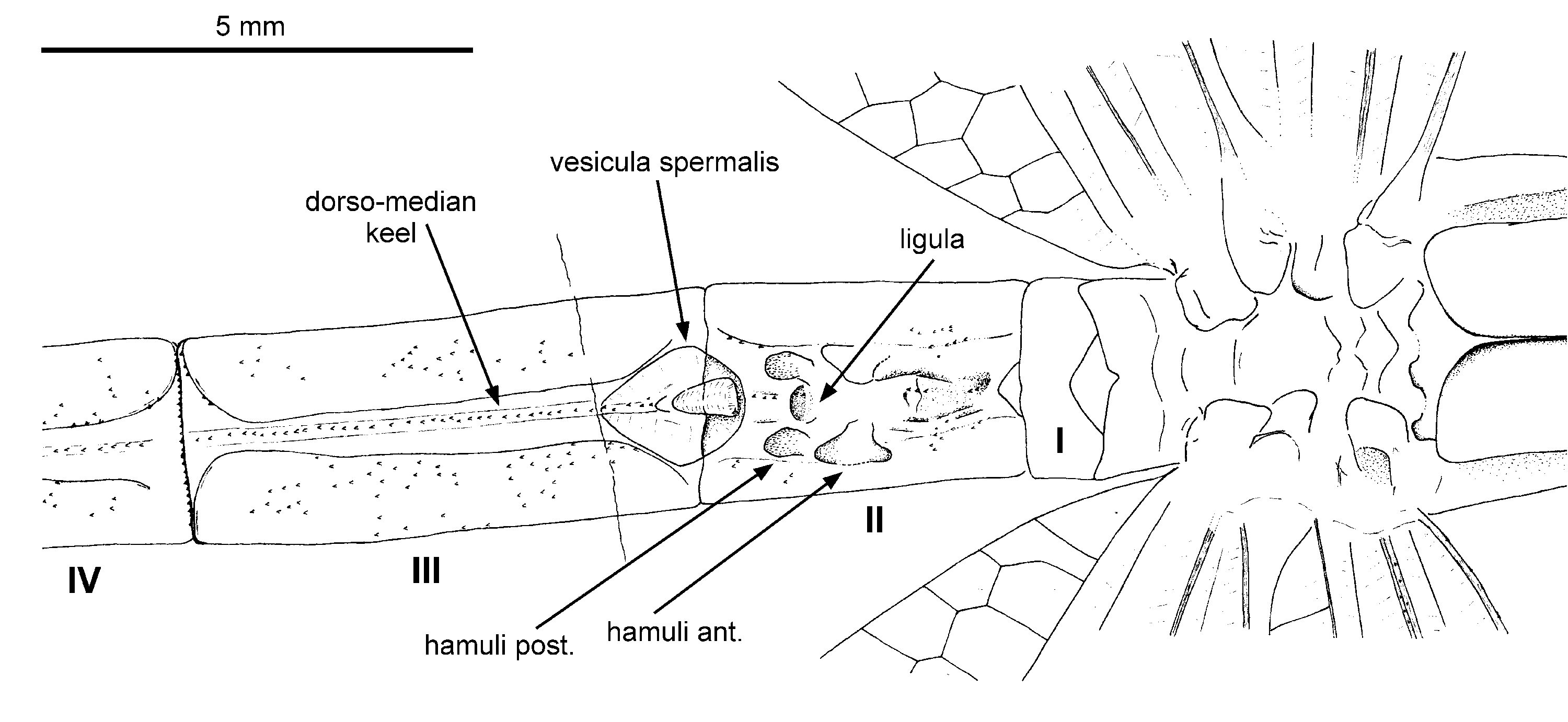
Tarsophlebia eximia, Upper Jurassic, Solnhofen Plattenkalk, secondary genital apparatus of male specimen JME SOS 1720

The male secondary genitalia were of a unique primitive type, with a small sperm vesicle on sternite 3, two pairs of small plate-like hamuli on sternite 2, and a very short median ligula on sternite 2. Obviously, none of these structures is hypertrophied as sperm intromittent organ (functional penis). In each of the three suborders of Recent odonates, a different part of this apparatus is enlarged and developed as intromittent organ and device for removal of foreign sperm (sperm competition): in Zygoptera it is the ligula, a median process of sternite 2; in Epiophlebiidae it is the lateral pair of posterior hamuli on segment 2; and in Anisoptera it is the unpaired sperm vesicle on the anterior part of sternite 3. The structure of the apparatus in Tarsophlebiidae is suggestive of an intermediate state between protodonates and modern odonates. An exceptionally well-preserved male specimen of Namurotypus sippeli showed that protodonate Meganisoptera completely lacked a secondary genital apparatus on abdominal segments 2 and 3 and still had primary genitalia on segment 9 that strongly resemble those of wingless silverfish, who do not copulate but deposit external spermatophores. Only on the basis of such a mating behaviour is the evolution of the odonate secondary copulation conceivable at all. A first step probably was the attachment of a spermatophore to the basal sternites of the male abdomen instead of a deposition on substrate. The female now had to fetch the spermatophore from the male venter. This created an adaptive pressure to create storage structures for the spermatophore and attachment structures for the female genitalia. Tarsophlebiidae probably represent this state of evolution. The development of liquid sperm and intromittent organs for copulation apparently evolved three times in parallel in the three extant suborders.

Lateral auricles on the sides of the basal abdomen in male Tarsophlebia eximia had been described by Nel et al. (1993). However, Bechly (1996) showed that these alleged male auricles were based on a misinterpretation of the hamuli posteriors, which was confirmed by Fleck et al. (2004).

Fleck et al. (2004) demonstrated that male Tarsophlebiidae did possess a unique type of anal appendages. The description of calopterygoid-like appendages of Tarsophlebia eximia, with apparently two pairs of claspers, was based on misinterpretations due to artifacts of preservation. The cerci are very long, with a double-barreled basal petiole and a distal plate-like expansion. The broken double-barrelled petioles of the two cerci have been commonly misinterpreted as two pairs of claspers, while the distal plates have been overlooked or regarded as artifacts. Indeed, Tarsophlebia does neither possess zygopteroid- nor anisopteroid-like appendages. There are no visible paraprocts (as in Zygoptera) and no epiproct (as in Epiophlebiidae and Anisoptera). If these structures are secondarily reduced or primarily missing is not clear.

=== Larva ===
No fossil larvae of this extinct family have yet been discovered.

== Classification ==
The family was established by Handlirsch (1906) on the basis of the type genus Tarsophlebia Hagen, 1866.

Tarsophlebiopsis mayi was recognized as valid by most authors until the most recent revision of the family by Fleck et al. (2004), who demonstrated that the holotype of this taxon most probably is only an aberrant specimen of Tarsophlebia eximia.

The family contains 2 described genera with totally 9 valid species:

- Genus †Tarsophlebia Hagen, 1866 (type genus; synonym: Tarsophlebiopsis Tillyard, 1923)
  Diagnosis: cubito-anal areas of forewings and hindwings with four rows of cells or less; 16 or less postnodal crossveins; less than ten secondary antenodal crossveins in hindwing; and IR1 relatively short.
  - Tarsophlebia eximia (Hagen, 1862) - (type species; type locality: Eichstätt, Bavaria, Germany; type horizon: Upper Jurassic, Malm zeta 2b, Lower Tithonian / 150 mya, Hybonotum Zone, Solnhofener Plattenkalk Formation; holotype: no. AS VI 44a,b at BSPG Munich Museum; size: forewing 37.1, hindwing 34.7 mm; synonyms: Tarsophlebia major Handlirsch, 1906, Tarsophlebia longissima Handlirsch, 1906, Tarsophlebiopsis mayi Tillyard, 1923)

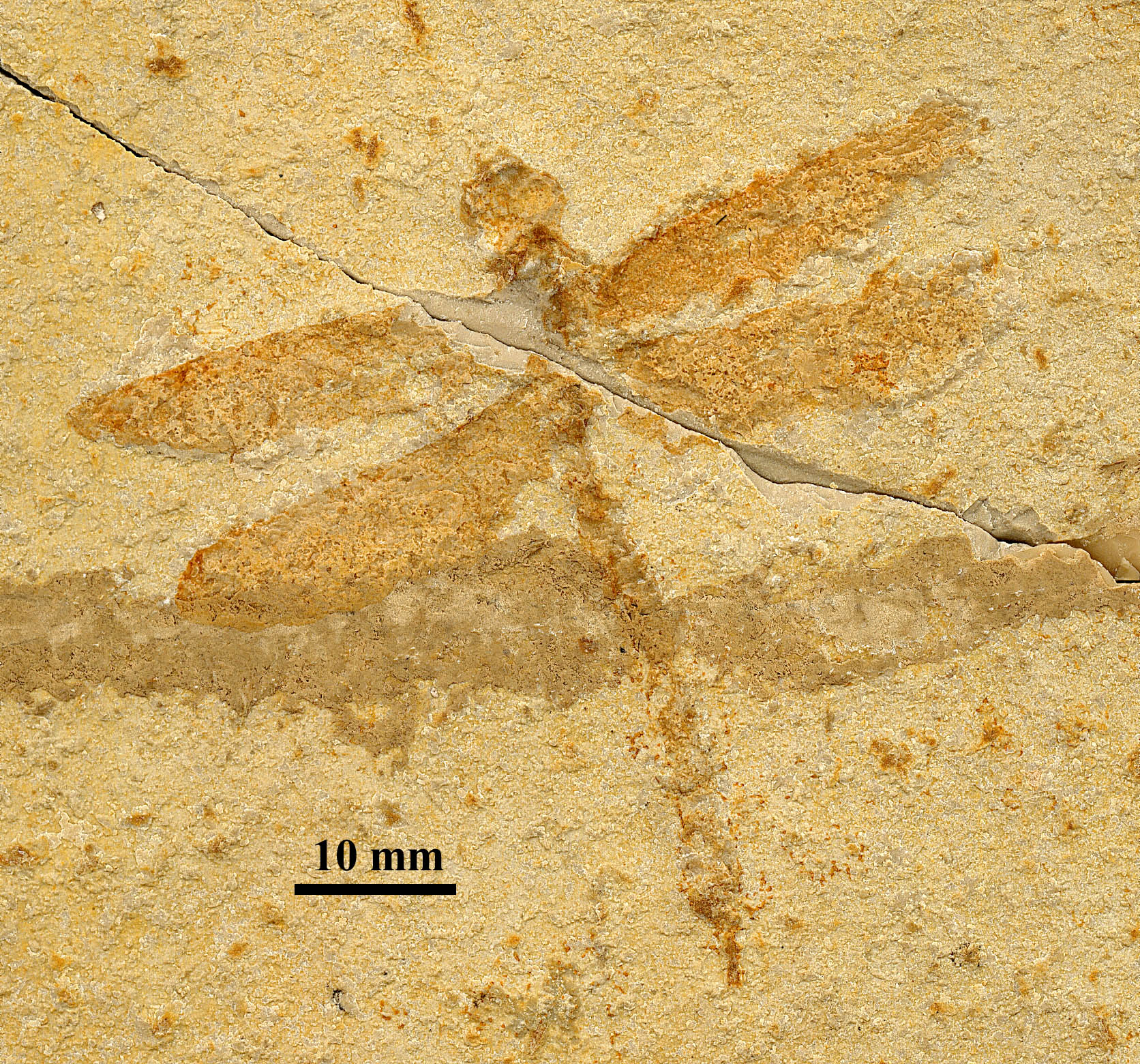
Tarsophlebia minor, Upper Jurassic, Solnhofen Plattenkalk, female with ovipositor, specimen at BMMS

  - Tarsophlebia minor Fleck et al., 2004 - (type locality: Eichstätt, Bavaria, Germany; type horizon: Upper Jurassic, Malm zeta 2b, Lower Tithonian / 150 mya, Hybonotum Zone, Solnhofener Plattenkalk Formation; holotype: no. 55 at MCZ; size: hindwing 26 mm)
- Genus Turanophlebia Pritykina, 1968
  Diagnosis: wings with more dense venation; presence of more than 25 postnodal crossveins (11–16 in Tarsophlebia); six or more rows of cells between CuA and posterior hindwing margin (less than five rows in Tarsophlebia); more than 10 secondary antenodal crossveins in hindwing (less than 10 in Tarsophlebia); IR1 longer than in Tarsophlebia; presence of long secondary longitudinal not zigzagged veins in area between IR2 and RP2.
  - Turanophlebia anglicana Fleck et al., 2004 - (type locality: Clockhouse (Butterley) Brickworks, England; type horizon: Lower Cretaceous, Upper Hauterivian / 130 mya, Lower Weald Clay; holotype: no. BMB 018531 at Booth Museum in Brighton / UK; size: hindwing 39.7 mm)
  - Turanophlebia liaoningensis Fang & Zheng, 2022 - (type locality: Huangbanjigou Village, western Liaoning, China; type horizon: Lower Cretaceous, Yixian Formation)
  - Turanophlebia martynovi Pritykina, 1968 - (type species; type locality: Karatau-Mikhailovka, Chimkent region, Southern Kazakhstan; type horizon: Upper Jurassic, Callovian- Kimmeridgian or Oxfordian-Kimmeridgian / 163 mya, Karabastau Formation; holotype: no. PIN 2554/210 at Palaeontological Institute Moscow; size: hindwing 41.0 mm)
  - Turanophlebia mongolica Fleck et al., 2004 - (type locality: Bon-Tsagaan, Bayanhongor Aimak, Central Mongolia; type horizon: Lower Cretaceous, Hauterivian-Barremian / 129 mya, Dzun-Bain Formation; holotype: no. PIN 3559/69 at Palaeontological Institute Moscow; size: hindwing 41.0 mm)
  - Turanophlebia neckini (Martynov, 1927) - (type locality: Karatau-Karabastau, Chimkent region, Southern Kazakhstan; type horizon: Upper Jurassic, Callovian- Kimmeridgian or Oxfordian-Kimmeridgian / 163 mya, Karabastau Formation; holotype: no. PIN 2452/3 at Palaeontological Institute Moscow; size: hindwing 39.0 mm; originally described in the genus Tarsophlebia)
  - Turanophlebia? sibirica Pritykina, 1977 - (type locality: Baissa, Vitim River, Buryat Republik, Siberia / Transbaikalia, Russia; type horizon: Lower Cretaceous, Neocomian-Berriasian / 145-140 mya or Barremian-Aptian / 125 mya, Zaza Formation; holotype: no. PIN 1989/1258 at Palaeontological Institute Moscow; estimated size: hindwing 46.9, based on a comparison of the distance between wing base and end of MP, which is 24.7 mm in T. sibirica and 21.6 mm in T. martynovi that has a total hindwing length of 41.0 mm)
  - Turanophlebia sinica Huang & Nel, 2009 - (type locality: Western Liaoning, PR China; type horizon: Lower Cretaceous, Barremian-Aptian / 125-121 mya, Yixian Formation; holotype: no. NIGP 148201 at Nanjing Institute of Geology and Palaeontology; size: forewing 49.5 and hindwing 45.5 mm)
  - Turanophlebia vitimensis Fleck et al., 2004 - (type locality: right side of Vitim River downstream Romanovka village, Eravna district, Buryat Republic, Siberia / Transaikalia, Russia; type horizon: Lower Cretaceous, Neocoman / Berriasian / 145-120mya or Barremian-Aptian / 125 mya, Zaza Formation; holotype: no. PIN 2361/1 at Palaeontological Institute Moscow; estimated size: hindwing 47.0 mm)

All other described taxa are synonyms of the type species Tarsophlebia eximia.

== Phylogeny ==
The monophyly of Tarsophlebiidae is strongly supported by the following set of derived characters (autapomorphies):
hindwings with hypertrophied subdiscoidal cell that is developed as "pseudo discoidal cell"; fusion of veins MAb+MP+CuA for a considerable distance before separation of MP and CuA in hindwing; vein AA strongly bent at insertion of CuP-crossing; extremely acute distal angles of forewing discoidal and subdiscoidal cell. The body characters "distinctly prolonged legs, with very long tarsi" and "male cerci with paddle-like distal expansions" are known from one species of the genus Tarsophlebia (T. eximia) and Turanophlebia (T. vitimensis) respectively, and thus belonged to the common ground plan of all Tarsophlebiidae. The extremely prolonged female ovipositor could be a further synapomorphy for the family, but it is only known from T. eximia and from a single specimen of T. minor at the Solnhofen museum.

Bechly (1996) and Nel et al. (2004: Appendix 2) proposed a long list of putative synapomorphies that demonstrate a closer relationship of Tarsophlebiidae with crown group Odonata:
presence of a costal triangle as broad and strong sclerotisation of the basal costal margin; the distal discoidal vein MAb (= distal side of discoidal cell) and the subdiscoidal vein (origin of the CuA on MP) are aligned and dorsally enforced by a strong sclerotisation, so that this structure appears to cross the vein MP and the concave fold along this vein (formation of a "discal brace" sensu Carle 1982); this discal brace is aligned with the arculus in the ground plan (only retained in some taxa with an open discoidal cell and in the forewings of Epiophlebia); the midfork (first fork of RP and base of IR2) is shifted basally, with the RP3/4 generally arising basal of the subnodus (reversed in some Coenagrionoidea) and RP2 arising close to the subnodus (in the ground plan); more derived type of nodus, with a kink in ScP; the oblique basal brace (still present in Protanisoptera and Protozygoptera) is transformed into a transverse "basal bracket" Ax0 which looks like a primary antenodal crossvein; presence of two strong primary antenodal crossveins Ax1 and Ax2 (also present in some Protozygoptera, e.g. specimen PIN 1/276 from the Upper Permian of Russia); pterostigma distinctly braced by an oblique postsubnodal crossvein beneath the basal margin of the pterostigma; presence of a tracheated lestine oblique vein 'O' between RP2 and IR2 (secondarily absent in some taxa); in the median space (= basal space) the convex vestige of the Media-stem ("vestigial CuA" sensu Fraser 1957) is suppressed since it is fused with the cubital stem to a common medio-cubital-stem (the alleged presence of this vestige in the holotype of Tarsophlebiopsis is a teratology or an artefact of preservation), convergent to some Protanisoptera, Triadophlebiomorpha, and Protozygoptera.

Bechly (1996) proposed that several unique symplesiomorphic features of all Tarsophlebiidae indicate that this family represents the sister group of all Recent Odonata. These features are the basally open discoidal cell in the hindwing (instead of closed) which implies an incomplete arculus, the (meanwhile disputed) presence of four tarsomeres of equal length (instead of only three), and the very primitive condition of the male secondary genital apparatus (viz ligula orimentary; vesicula spermalis still very short and flat with a very wide porus) without any intromittent organ. Bechly therefore considered the similarities of Tarsophlebiidae and Epiprocta mentioned by Nel et al. (1993), viz the less separated and relatively large eyes, the presence of two cephalic sutures, and the small leg spines (also present in Meganisoptera), as symplesiomorphies.

However, based on a cladistic study of 14 characters Fleck et al. (2004) again suggested that Tarsophlebiidae might rather be the sister group of the clade Epiprocta that includes Epiophlebiidae and Anisoptera. Nevertheless, this result has a very low statistical support and might as well be an artefact of the parsimony computer algorithm, because none of the 14 characters represents an unambiguous synapomorphy for Tarsophlebiidae and Epiprocta.

Huang & Nel (2009) presented convincing evidence from a new fossil Tarsophlebiidae from China that the number of tarsomeres is only three as in modern odonates, but that the first tarsomere is about twice as long as the others. Bechly (1996) already discussed this possibility and suggested that such a long basal tarsomere, compared to the short basal tarsomere in protodonates and all Recent odonates, could still be a plesiomorphic state that could have resulted by the fusion of two basal tarsomeres. Huang & Nel (2004) state that there is no evidence for such a fusion in the fossils and that the elongation of the first segment could as well be a derived feature (autapomorphy) of Tarsophlebiidae.

The two alternative phylogenetic positions of Tarsophlebiidae

Hypothesis of Fleck et al. (2004):

- Odonata
  - Zygoptera
  - - †Tarsophlebioptera (only †Tarsophlebiidae)
    - - †Sieblosiidae
      - Epiprocta
        - Anisozygoptera (restricted to Epiophlebiidae)
        - - Anisoptera

Hypothesis of Bechly (1996, 2007):

- Odonatoptera
  - †Tarsophlebioptera (only †Tarsophlebiidae)
  - Odonata
    - Zygoptera (incl. †Sieblosiidae)
    - Epiprocta
      - Anisozygoptera (restricted to Epiophlebiidae)
      - - Anisoptera

== Biology ==
Next to nothing is known about the ecology and behavior of Tarsophlebiidae, but it probably was quite similar to Recent odonates. With their very long ovipositor the females probably inserted their eggs into mud in or close to water, similar to modern Cordulegastridae. It is remarkable that two other groups of Mesozoic odonates (viz Steleopteridae and Aeschnidiidae) had a similarly elongated ovipositor.

== Geographical and geological distribution ==
The fossil record of this family ranges from Upper Jurassic of Kazakhstan and Germany to the Lower Cretaceous of England, Transbaikalia, Mongolia and China. There are no records of Tarsophlebiidae from any fossil locality outside the Eurasiatic region.

== History ==
The first tarsophlebiid fossils were specimens of Tarsophlebia eximia from the Upper Jurassic Solnhofen Plattenkalk of Germany described as "Heterophlebia eximia" and Euphaea longiventris by Hagen (1862). Larger revisions of this family have been provided by Nel et al. (1993) and Fleck et al. (2004).

=== Notable specimens ===
Beside the important type specimens there are also several exceptionally well preserved fossils that contribute to our knowledge of the morphology of Tarsophlebiidae. These include the following specimens:

- female specimen no. SOS 3609 (Tarsophlebia eximia) at the Jura-Museum Eichstätt shows the hypertrophied ovipositor
- female specimen without collection number (Tarsophlebia minor) at the Bürgermeister Müller Museum in Solnhofen (BMMS), shows the hypertrophied ovipositor (see photo)
- male specimen no. SOS 1720 (Tarsophlebia eximia) at the Jura-Museum Eichstätt is the only known specimen that shows under alcohol-cover the crucial structures of the secondary genital apparatus of Tarsophlebiidae
- male specimen no. AS-VI-44b (the holotype of Tarsophlebia eximia) at BSPGM shows an apparent segmentation of the tarsus into four segments on the right hindleg
- specimen no. JME 1960/66K at the Jura-Museum Eichstätt shows an apparent segmentation of the tarsus into four segments on the left foreleg
- male specimen no. 6126 (Tarsophlebia eximia) at coll. Carpenter of MCZ shows a perfectly preserved head in dorsal view
- male specimen no. 6222 (Tarsophlebia eximia) at coll. Carpenter of MCZ shows well-preserved cerci
- male specimen PIN 2361/1 (holotype of Turanophlebia vitimensis) shows very well-preserved cerci
- male specimen NIGP 148201 (holotype of Turanophlebia sinica) has a well-preserved head and the best preserved legs of all known fossils of Tarsophlebiidae, which show the crucial segmentation of the tarsus. In the original description (Huang & Nel, 2009: Fig. 10) the visible suture between clypeus and labrum is erroneously labeled as "mandibles".
- male specimen of Tarsophlebia eximia in private collection Spiegelberg (Heidelberg, Germany) shows perfectly preserved cerci (see photo)
