= Protanisoptera =

Protanisoptera Temporal range: Artinskian–Changhsingian

Scientific classification
- Kingdom: Animalia
- Phylum: Arthropoda
- Clade: Pancrustacea
- Class: Insecta
- Superorder: Odonatoptera
- Clade: †Protanisoptera; Carpenter, 1931

Families
- See text.

Synonyms
- Permanisoptera Martynov, 1931

Extinct clade of insects

Protanisoptera is an extinct clade of winged insects that lived during the Permian period. They were originally established as a suborder of Odonata (dragonflies and damselflies), but are now are generally considered a member of the superorder Odonatoptera. They are the sister group to the Discoidalia, a clade including modern Odonata. Their wings have a structure resembling the pterostigmata of modern Odonata due to convergent evolution, though it is crossed by the anterior radial vein (RA) unlike in true pterostigmata which are limited to the area between the costa (vein C) and RA.

== Classification ==
The following taxa are included in Protanisoptera.

- Clade †Protanisoptera Carpenter, 1931
  - Family †Pholidoptilidae Zalessky, 1931
    - †Pholidoptilon Zalessky, 1931 – Baitugan Formation, Russia, Middle Permian (Roadian) (known from a forewing)
  - Family †Polytaxineuridae Tillyard, 1935
    - †Polytaxineura Tillyard, 1935 – Warner's Bay, Croudace Bay Formation, Australia, Late Permian (Changhsingian) (known from a forewing and fragments of hindwings)
  - Clade †Ditaxineuromorpha Pritykina, 1980
    - Family †Permaeschnidae Martynov, 1931
      - †Gondvanoptilon Rösler et al., 1981 – Irati Formation, Brazil, Early Permian (Kungurian) (known from a nearly complete wing)
      - †Permaeschna Martynov, 1931 – Iva-Gora Beds Formation, Russia, Middle Permian (Roadian) (known from wing fragments and a nearly complete wing)
    - Clade †Ditaxineurida Bechly in Huguet et al., 2002
      - Family †Callimokaltaniidae Zalessky, 1955
        - †Callimokaltania Zalessky, 1955 – Mitina Formation, Russia, Middle Permian (Roadian) (known from nearly complete wings)
      - Superfamily †Ditaxineuroidea Tillyard, 1926
        - Family †Ditaxineuridae Tillyard, 1926
          - †Ditaxineura Tillyard, 1926 – Wellington Formation, Kansas, United States, Early Permian (Artinskian) (known from wing fragments and some complete wings)
          - †Proditaxineura Huguet et al., 2002 – Chekarda site, Koshelevka Formation, Russia, Early Permian (Kungurian) (known from incomplete body fossils)
        - Family †Hemizygopteridae Zalessky, 1955
          - †Hemizygopteron Zalessky, 1955 – Barda locality, Koshelevka Formation, Russia, Early Permian (Kungurian) (known from wing fragments)
          - (?)†Bansheepteron Garrouste et al., 2017 – Gonfaron, Pélitique Formation, France, Early–Middle Permian (Artinskian–Wordian) (known from a wing fragment)
  - incertae sedis
    - †Ditaxineurella Martynov, 1940 – Chekarda site, Koshelevka Formation, Russia, Early Permian (Kungurian) (known from wing fragments)

The families Camptotaxineuridae (from the Early Permian of Kansas) and Kaltanoneuridae (from the Late Permian of Russia) were originally included in Protanisoptera, but were excluded from the group by Huguet et al. (2002). The former family possibly belongs to the Palaeodictyoptera, while the latter is now included in the Protozygoptera.
