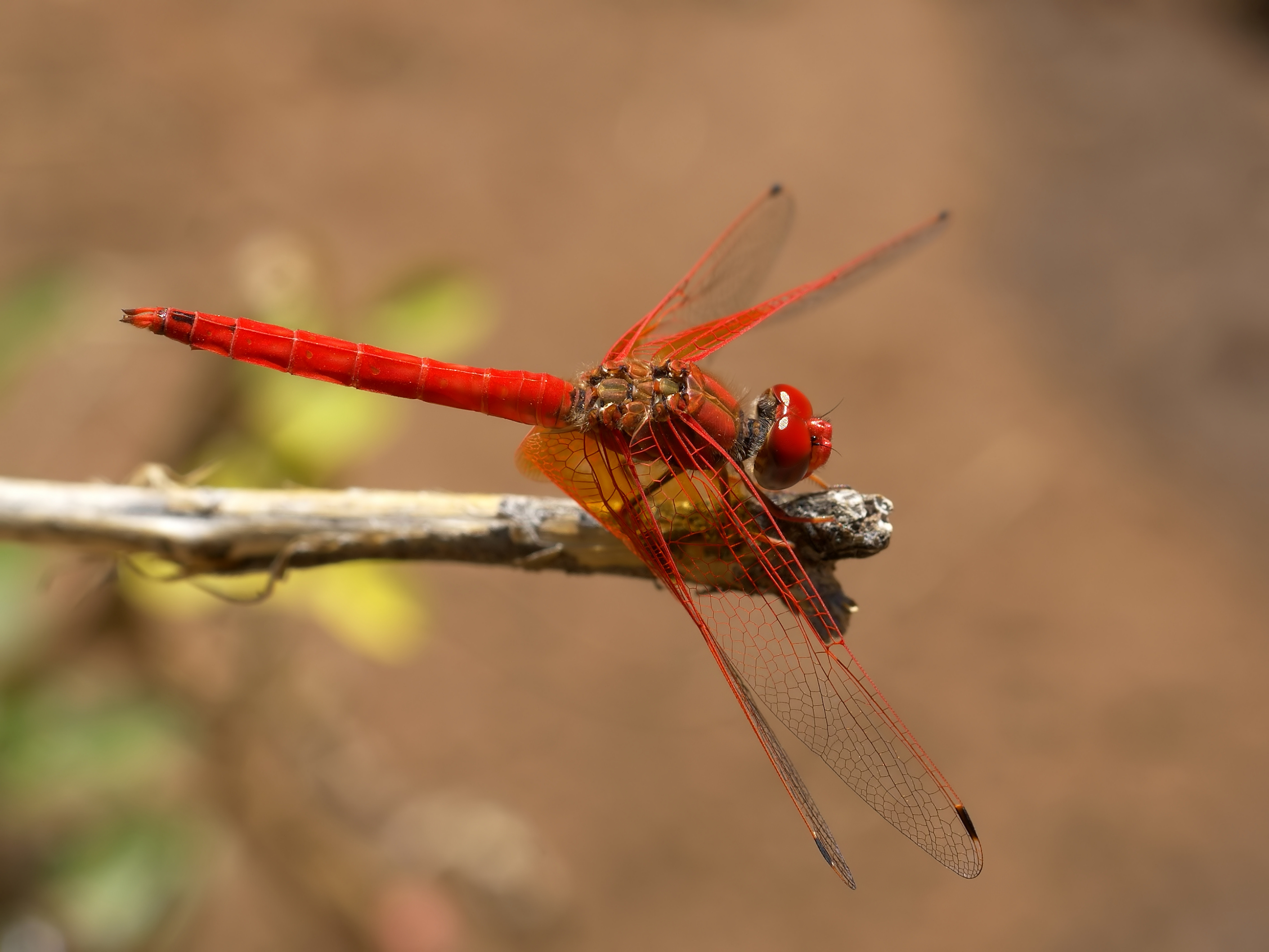
- Kirby's dropwing (Trithemis kirbyi)

Scientific classification
- Kingdom: Animalia
- Phylum: Arthropoda
- Clade: Pancrustacea
- Class: Insecta
- Order: Odonata
- Suborder: Epiprocta; Lohmann, 1996

Infraorders
- Epiophlebioptera; Anisoptera; For extinct groups, see text

= Epiprocta =

Epiprocta Temporal range: Early Jurassic–Recent

Alternative taxonomic suborder of odonates

Epiprocta, also called Epiproctophora, is a proposed suborder of Odonata that groups the dragonflies with the living genus Epiophlebia and several extinct lineages. It is distinguished from the damselflies, which form the suborder Zygoptera. The crown group Epiprocta first appeared during the Early Jurassic.

== Classification ==
Epiprocta was established by Heinrich Lohmann in 1996 to accommodate dragonflies together with lineages traditionally placed in Anisozygoptera, which were regarded as a paraphyletic assemblage when fossil taxa were included. In this arrangement, Anisoptera is treated as an infraorder, while the living Epiophlebia lineage is placed in the infraorder Epiophlebioptera. Lohmann also included Tarsophlebiidae, but Rehn (2003) placed it closer to Zygoptera.

An alternative classification used by the World Odonata List recognises three suborders of living Odonata: Zygoptera, Anisozygoptera and Anisoptera. In that arrangement, Epiophlebia is placed in Anisozygoptera, and Epiprocta is not used in the classification of living species.

Cladogram of Epiprocta after Rehn (2003):

- Odonata
  - Zygoptera (damselflies)
  - Epiprocta
    - Epiophlebioptera
    - - †Isophlebioptera
      - - †Heterophlebioptera
        - - †Stenophlebioptera
          - - †Aeschnidioptera
            - Anisoptera (dragonflies)

Epiproctophora is used as the clade containing all odonatans living and extinct more closely related to living epiproctans than to damselflies.

Cladogram of Odonata including Epiproctophora by Deregnaucourt et al. 2023.

- - Odonata crown group
    - Zygoptera (damselflies)
    - Epiproctophora
      - - †Euthemistidae
        - †Selenothemistidae
        - - †Archithemistidae
          - - †Campterophlebiidae
            - †Isophlebiidae
        - - †Sphenophlebiidae
          - - †Asiopteridae
            - †Cyclothemistidae
      - - †Erichschmidtiidae
        - - †Liassostenophlebiidae
          - - †Prostenophlebiidae
            - †Stenophlebiidae
        - - †Myopophlebiidae
          - - †Heterophlebiidae
            - - †Liassophlebiidae
              - †Parastenophlebiidae
        - - †Juragomphidae
          - †Liassogomphidae
          - - †Aeschnidiidae
            - Anisoptera (modern dragonflies)
