= Campterophlebia =

Campterophlebia Temporal range: 183.0–174.1 Ma

Scientific classification
- Kingdom: Animalia
- Phylum: Arthropoda
- Class: Insecta
- Order: Odonata
- Family: †Campterophlebiidae
- Genus: †Campterophlebia; Bode, 1905
- Species: †C. elegans

Binomial name
- †Campterophlebia elegans Bode, 1905

Extinct genus of dragonflies

Campterophlebia is an extinct genus of prehistoric dragonflies in the family Campterophlebiidae. The species C. elegans is from the Jurassic (Lower Toarcian) Posidonia Shale of Germany. It is the largest Early Jurassic flying insect, with a wing over 7.31 cm length and 1.73 cm width.
