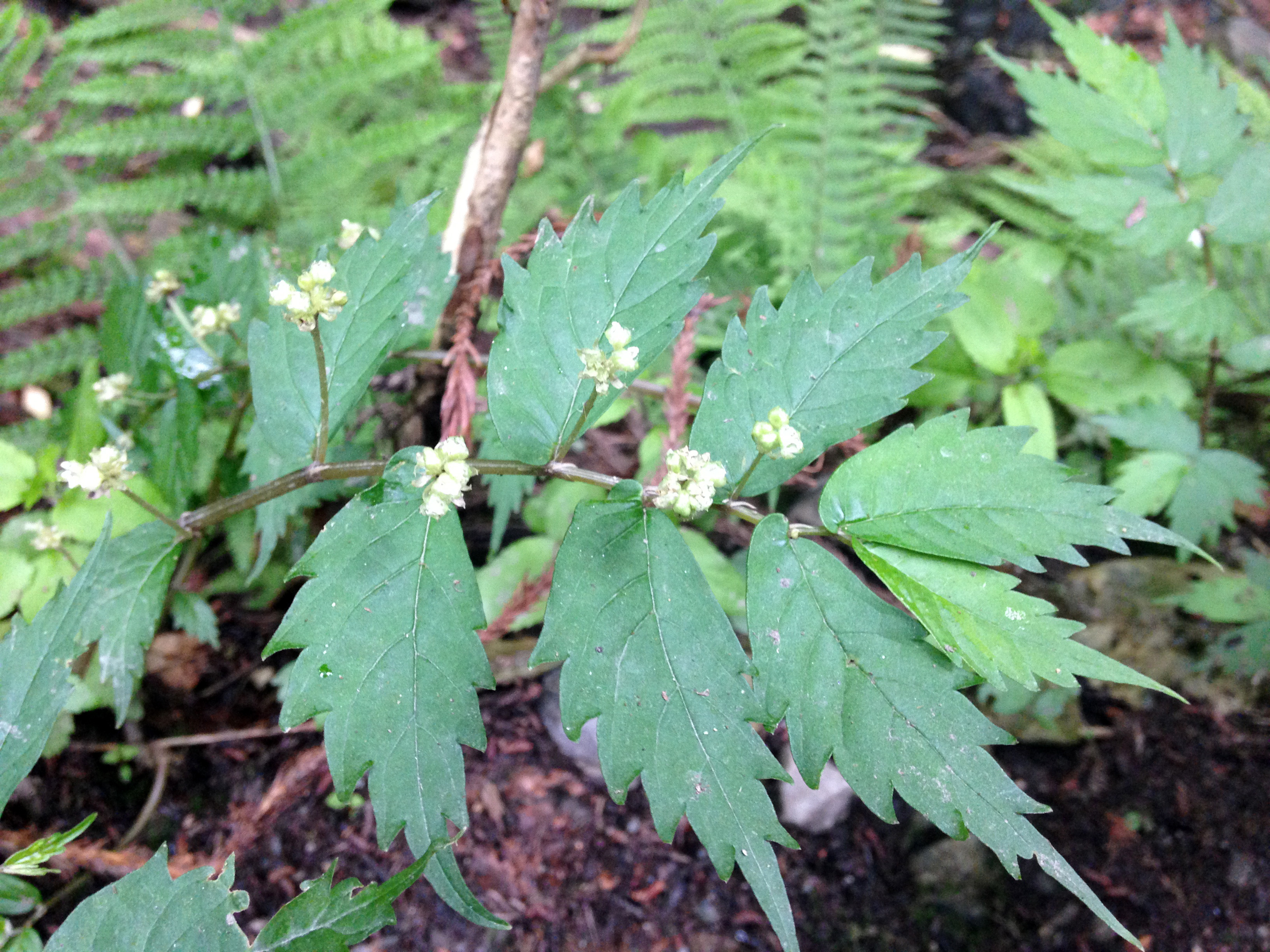

Scientific classification
- Kingdom: Plantae
- Clade: Tracheophytes
- Clade: Angiosperms
- Clade: Eudicots
- Clade: Rosids
- Order: Rosales
- Family: Urticaceae
- Genus: Elatostema
- Species: E. umbellatum

Binomial name
- Elatostema umbellatum (Siebold & Zucc.) Blume

Synonyms
- Elatostema japonica

= Elatostema umbellatum =

Species of flowering plant

Elatostema umbellatum is a species of flowering plant in the nettle family (Urticaceae). It is native to Japan, where it is found from the Kantō region westward. Its natural habitat is in moist, deeply forested places in the mountains.

It is a perennial, growing 20 to 30 cm tall. It has serrated leaves, 3 to 6 cm long, with up to 5 teeth per side. It produces umbels of small flowers from March to May.

It is similar to the wider-ranging and more robust Elatostema involucratum, which has been considered a variety of Elatostema umbellatum by some authors (as E. umbellatum var. majus).
