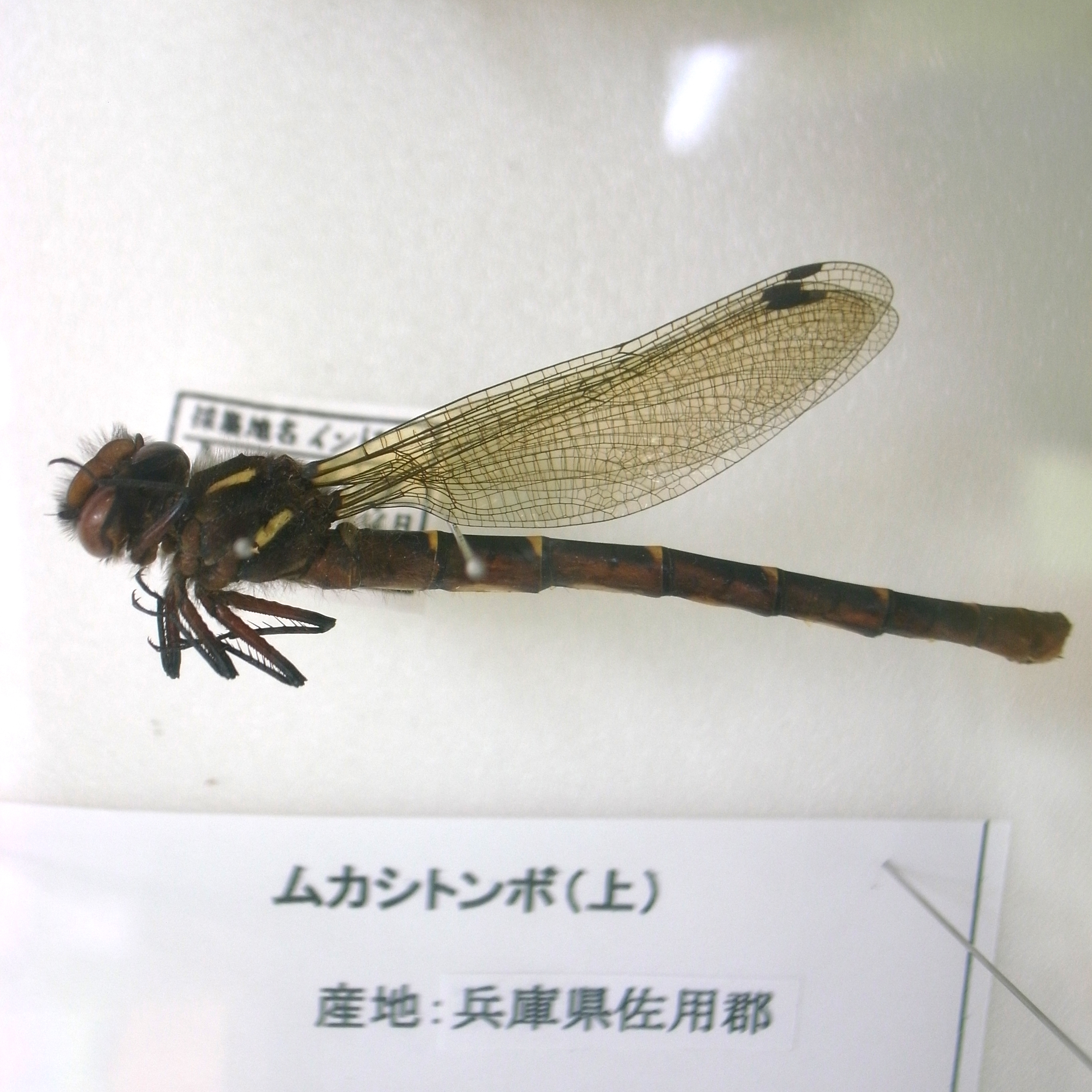

Conservation status
- Near Threatened (IUCN 3.1)

Scientific classification
- Kingdom: Animalia
- Phylum: Arthropoda
- Clade: Pancrustacea
- Class: Insecta
- Order: Odonata
- Suborder: Anisozygoptera
- Family: Epiophlebiidae
- Genus: Epiophlebia
- Species: E. laidlawi

Binomial name
- Epiophlebia laidlawi Tillyard, 1921
- Distribution of Epiophlebia laidlawi

= Epiophlebia laidlawi =

Species of odonate

Epiophlebia laidlawi, the Himalayan relict dragonfly, is a species of odonate in the family Epiophlebiidae. It is one of three recognised species of Epiophlebia, the only living genus in the suborder Anisozygoptera. It occurs in the Himalayas and the Hengduan Mountains of southwestern China.

The species was first described by Robin Tillyard in 1921 from a larva collected by Stanley Kemp in June 1918 from a stream above Sonada, near Darjeeling. Frank Fortescue Laidlaw identified it as a species of Epiophlebia after dissecting its wing sheaths. Tillyard confirmed the identification and named the species in Laidlaw's honour.

== Subspecies ==
- Epiophlebia laidlawi laidlawi Tillyard, 1921 (Bhutan, Nepal and India)
- Epiophlebia laidlawi daliensis Zhang, Yang, Wei & Lyu, 2025 (Yunnan, China)

== Appearance ==
=== Adults ===
The head of an adult is spherical and densely sclerotized, with large, laterally placed compound eyes that do not meet medially. Ocelli are arranged triangularly, with the median ocellus positioned anterior to an elevated transverse vertex ridge. The vertex is U- to V-shaped in dorsal view and lacks bright markings. Antennae are composed of five segments: a short cylindrical scape, a dorsoventrally flattened and elongated pedicel, and a slender three-segmented flagellum. Mouthparts are compact; the labrum is broad and short, covered with fine hairs. Overall head coloration is dark brown to black, without contrasting yellow markings.

The forewings and hindwings are similar in size and shape, and are held together over the body when at rest, as in damselflies.

The thorax is powerfully built and tilted posteriorly, typical of odonates. The prothorax is small and weakly developed, while the meso- and metathorax form a large pterothorax with well-defined sclerites and wing articulation structures. Two narrow yellow longitudinal stripes may be present on the lateral thorax, contrasting with an otherwise dark brown background. Legs are strong; femora are cylindrical with rows of small spines, and tibiae bear long, robust spines.

Wings are long and narrow, with venation showing considerable intraspecific variability. Vein patterns may differ even between left and right wings of the same individual, reducing their taxonomic usefulness.

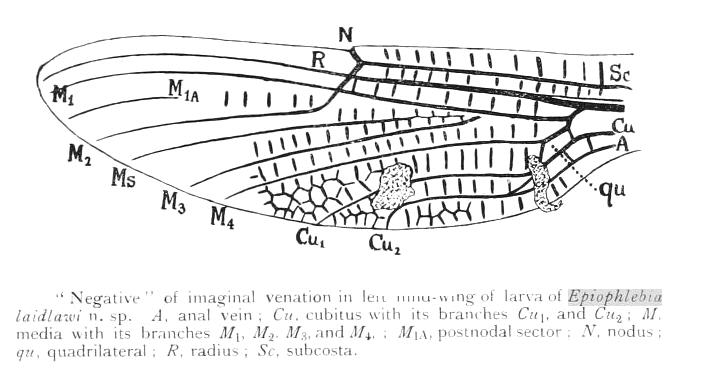
Venation of E. laidlawi

The abdomen is cylindrical and composed of ten segments. Segments 3–6 are laterally compressed, while segments 8–9 broaden slightly, giving a funnel-like appearance toward the tip. Coloration ranges from brown to nearly black distally, often with faint yellow dorsal markings on mid-segments.

Secondary male genitalia are located on abdominal segments 2–3 and are highly distinctive, particularly the anchor-shaped hamulus posterior. Female genitalia form a well-developed ovipositor on segments 8–9, with a blunt, hook-like process on sternite 8.

=== Larvae ===
Larvae resemble those of dragonflies, with a stout body that becomes more elongated through development. The cuticle is thick and covered with small wart-like projections. Coloration varies from light brown in early instars to darker brown in later stages.

The head is broad with large compound eyes and a well-developed prehensile labium (“mask”). Antennae are five-segmented, with a notably elongated first flagellomere. The thorax bears pronounced ridges and spearhead-like projections. The abdomen is cylindrical and ventrally flattened, with rounded dorsolateral processes on segments 7–9. Anal appendages are short, with the epiproct slightly divided at the apex.

== Distribution ==
This species has been found in several locations along the Himalayas including Chittrey, Mt. Shivapuri, Kathmandu area, Solokhumbu region, all in Nepal, where it breeds in streams between 6,000 and 11,500 ft (1,800–3,500m). However, studies since 2015 have determined its range to also include Bhutan, India (Himalayas) and China (Hengduan Mountains).

== Habitat ==
Epiophlebia laidlawi flies at 3000 to 3650 m and has few predators. Alan Davies suggested in 1992 that they bred in waterfalls at 2000 m with the adults flying higher later. Breeding sites at lower altitudes were discovered later. Peter Northcott mentioned 1860-2380m in 1988 but Stephen Butler discovered larvae on Shivapuri at 1800m.

== Ecology ==
The larvae grow for five to six years, which is believed to be the longest for any odonate. Specimens may emerge after nine years in many cases. Stephen Butler notes that the larvae stridulate when disturbed. The larvae appear like those of the Anisoptera but are unable to use the Anisopteran jet-propulsion mode of escape; instead they must walk.

The adult flight is slow and rather uncoordinated. The discoidal cell in the forewing is uncrossed and four sided and in the hindwing the crossvein is long making the cell distally wide. The arculus is situated between the primary antenodals.

== Reproduction ==
In mating, the male grasps the female behind the head as in the Anisoptera. The female is not accompanied during egg laying. She lays eggs into plant tissue while sitting on the stem of a waterside plant. The eggs are laid from bottom to top in a regular zig-zag pattern. The preferred plants are usually bryophytes.
