= Campterophlebiidae =

Campterophlebiidae Temporal range: Late Triassic–Early Cretaceous

Scientific classification
- Kingdom: Animalia
- Phylum: Arthropoda
- Class: Insecta
- Order: Odonata
- Suborder: Epiprocta
- Clade: †Isophlebioptera
- Clade: †Isophlebiida
- Superfamily: †Isophlebioidea
- Family: †Campterophlebiidae; Handlirsch 1920

Genera
- See text

Extinct family of insects

Campterophlebiidae is an extinct family of damsel-dragonflies native to Eurasia from the Late Triassic to the Early Cretaceous.

== Taxonomy ==
The family has around 40 recognised genera, with fossils known from China, Germany, Kazakhstan, Kyrgyzstan, Luxembourg, Mongolia, the Russian Federation, and the United Kingdom.

- Adelophlebia Pritykina, 1980
- Amnifleckia Zhang et al., 2006
- Angaroneura Pritykina, 1985
- Angustiphlebia Li et al., 2013
- Azarphlebia Nel & Huang, 2020
- Bathmophlebia Pritykina, 1970
- Bellabrunetia Fleck & Nel, 2002
- Campterophlebia Bode, 1905
- Ctenogampsophlebia Petrulevičius et al., 2011
- Dorsettia Whalley, 1985
- Gallodorsettia Nel & Weis, 2017
- Gampsophlebia Pritykina, 1980
- Honghea Zheng et al., 2018
- Hsiufua Zhang & Wang, 2013
- Hypsomelana Pritykina, 1968
- Hypsophlebia Pritykina, 1971
- Hypsothemis Pritykina, 1968
- Junfengi Zheng & Zhang, 2017
- Jurassophlebia Zheng et al., 2019
- Karatawia Martynov, 1925
- Lateophlebia Kelly & Nel, 2018
- Melanohypsa Pritykina, 1968
- Olonkia Pritykina, 1985
- Oreophlebia Pritykina, 1970
- Oshinia Pritykina, 1985
- Parabrunetia Huang et al., 2006
- Parafleckium Li et al., 2012
- Parasinitsia Tian et al., 2023
- Parazygokaratawia Huang et al., 2018
- Petrophlebia Tillyard, 1925
- Pritykinia Nel et al., 2009
- Pternopteron Pritykina, 1970
- Qibinlina Huang & Nel, 2009
- Sagulia Pritykina, 1970
- Sarytashia Pritykina, 1970
- Sibirioneura Pritykina, 1985
- Sinitsia Pritykina, 2006
- Sinokaratawia Nel et al., 2007
- Sogdophlebia Pritykina, 1970
- Xanthohypsa Pritykina, 1970
- Zygokaratawia Nel et al., 2008

== Phylogeny ==
The family is placed as close relatives of the Isophlebiidae within the superfamily Isophlebioidea.

Phylogenetic position of Campterophlebiidae after Deregnaucourt et al. 2023:

- - Odonata crown group
    - Zygoptera (damselflies)
    - Epiproctophora
      - - †Euthemistidae
        - †Selenothemistidae
        - - †Archithemistidae
          - - †Campterophlebiidae
            - †Isophlebiidae
        - - †Sphenophlebiidae
          - - †Asiopteridae
            - †Cyclothemistidae
      - - †Erichschmidtiidae
        - - †Liassostenophlebiidae
          - - †Prostenophlebiidae
            - †Stenophlebiidae
        - - †Myopophlebiidae
          - - †Heterophlebiidae
            - - †Liassophlebiidae
              - †Parastenophlebiidae
        - - †Juragomphidae
          - †Liassogomphidae
          - - †Aeschnidiidae
            - Anisoptera (modern dragonflies)
