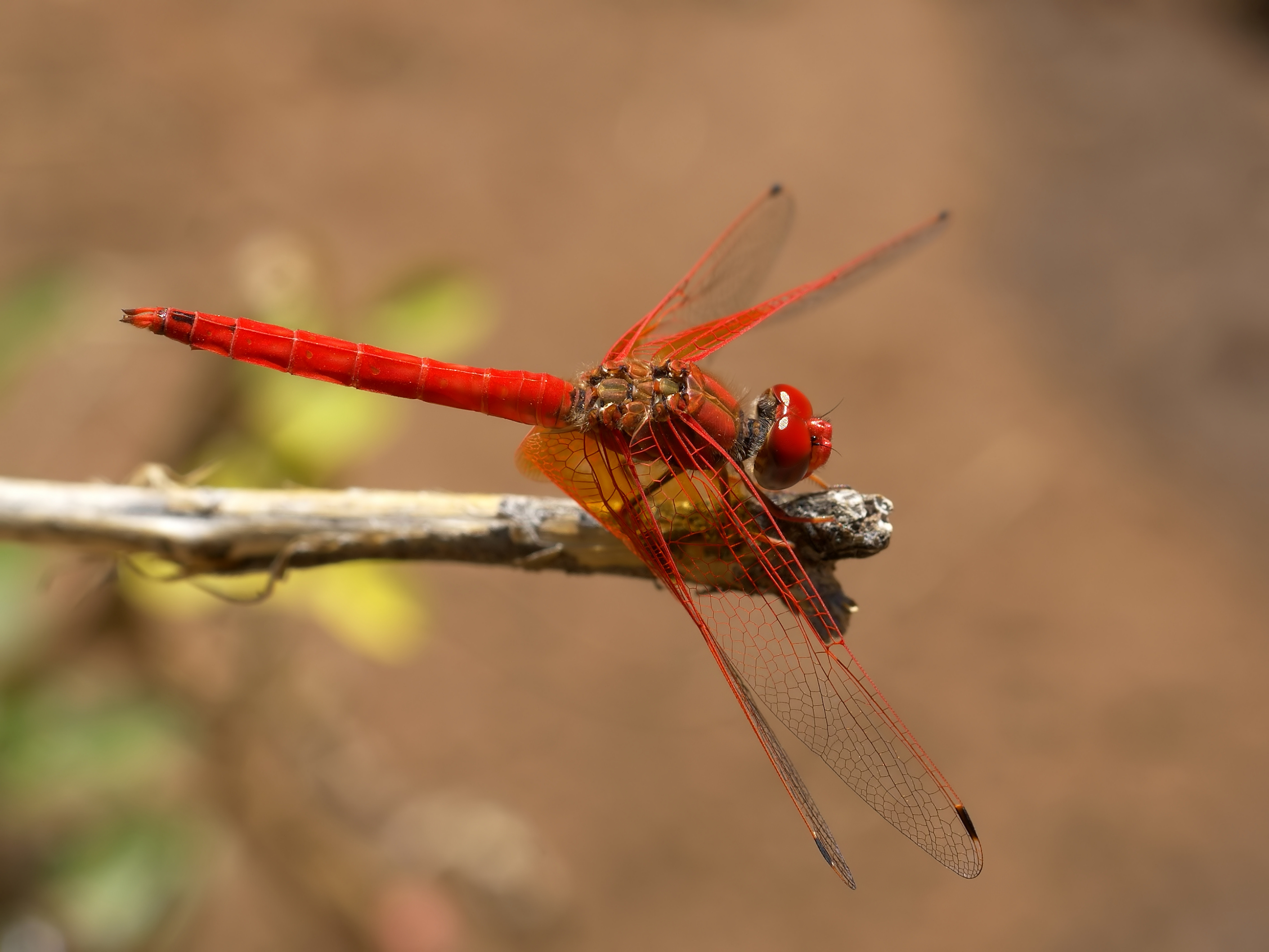
- Male, Tsumeb, Namibia

Conservation status
- Least Concern (IUCN 3.1)

Scientific classification
- Kingdom: Animalia
- Phylum: Arthropoda
- Class: Insecta
- Order: Odonata
- Infraorder: Anisoptera
- Family: Libellulidae
- Genus: Trithemis
- Species: T. kirbyi

Binomial name
- Trithemis kirbyi Selys, 1891
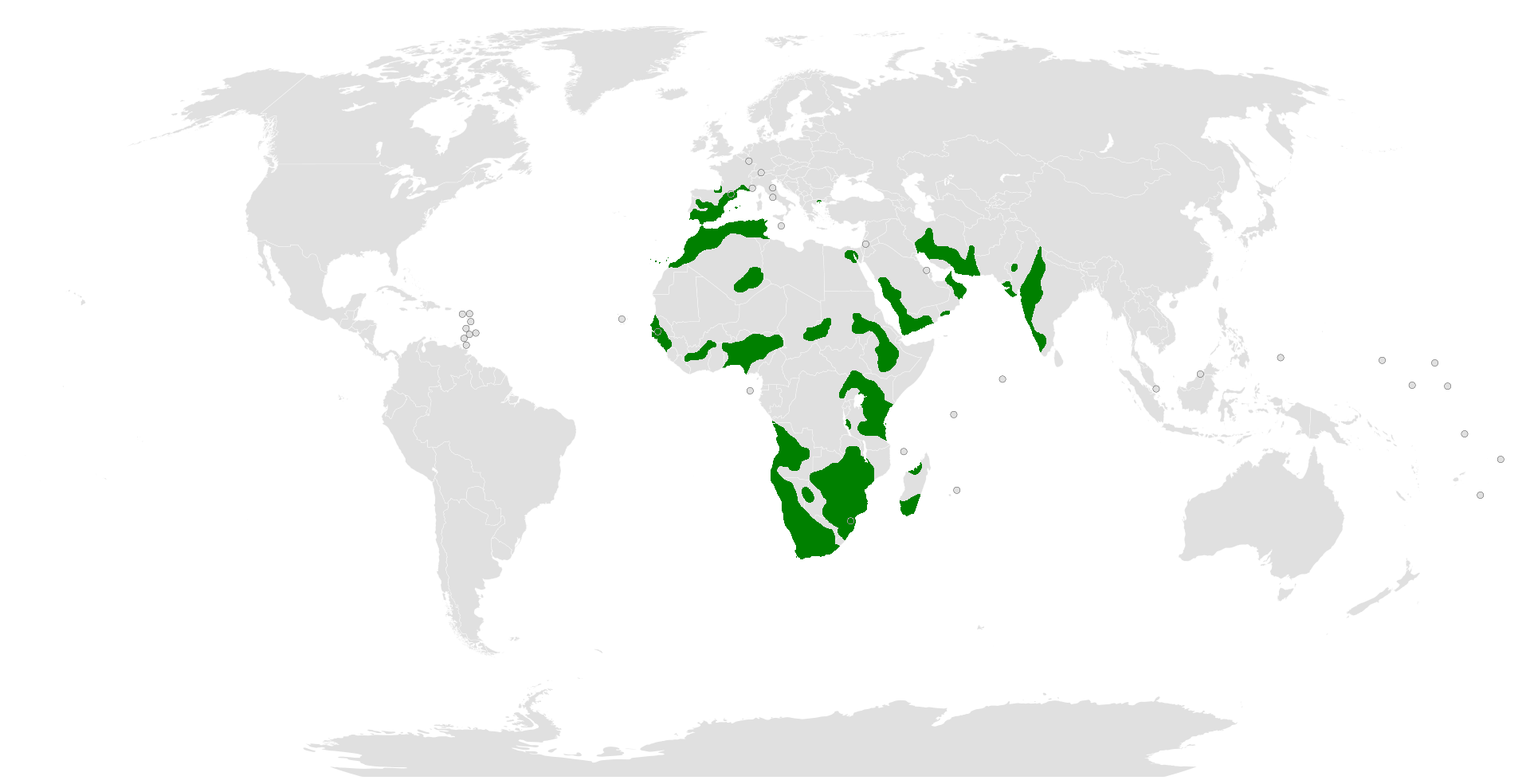
- Range of Trithemis kirbyi

Synonyms
- Trithemis kirbyi ardens (Gerstäcker, 1891)

= Trithemis kirbyi =

Species of dragonfly

Trithemis kirbyi, also known as the Kirby's dropwing, orange-winged dropwing, or scarlet rock glider is a species of dragonfly in the family Libellulidae.

== Distribution ==
It is found in Algeria, Angola, Benin, Botswana, Burkina Faso, Chad, Comoros, the Democratic Republic of the Congo, Ivory Coast, Egypt, Ethiopia, Gambia, Ghana, Guinea, Kenya, Liberia, Madagascar, Malawi, Morocco, Mozambique, Namibia, Nigeria, Senegal, Somalia, South Africa, Sudan, Tanzania, Togo, Uganda, Western Sahara, Zambia, Zimbabwe, and possibly Burundi. It is also present in southern Europe, the Arabian Peninsula, the Indian Ocean Islands and South Asia to India.

Since 2003 this African tropical dragonfly has been colonizing Europe helped by a widespread increase in temperatures. It is now breeding successfully in Spain, Portugal and France.

== Description and ecology ==
The adult male abdomen measures 21–24 mm and hind wing 24–27 mm. Female abdomen measures 23 mm and hind wing 26–30 mm. The male is a medium-sized scarlet dragonfly with a broad reddish amber patch on the base of transparent wings. The female is similar to the male, but duller in color. Its natural habitats are subtropical or tropical streams and rivers. It breeds in marshes, ponds, and lakes, and prefers to perch on exposed rocks, dry areas, and boulders in riverbeds.

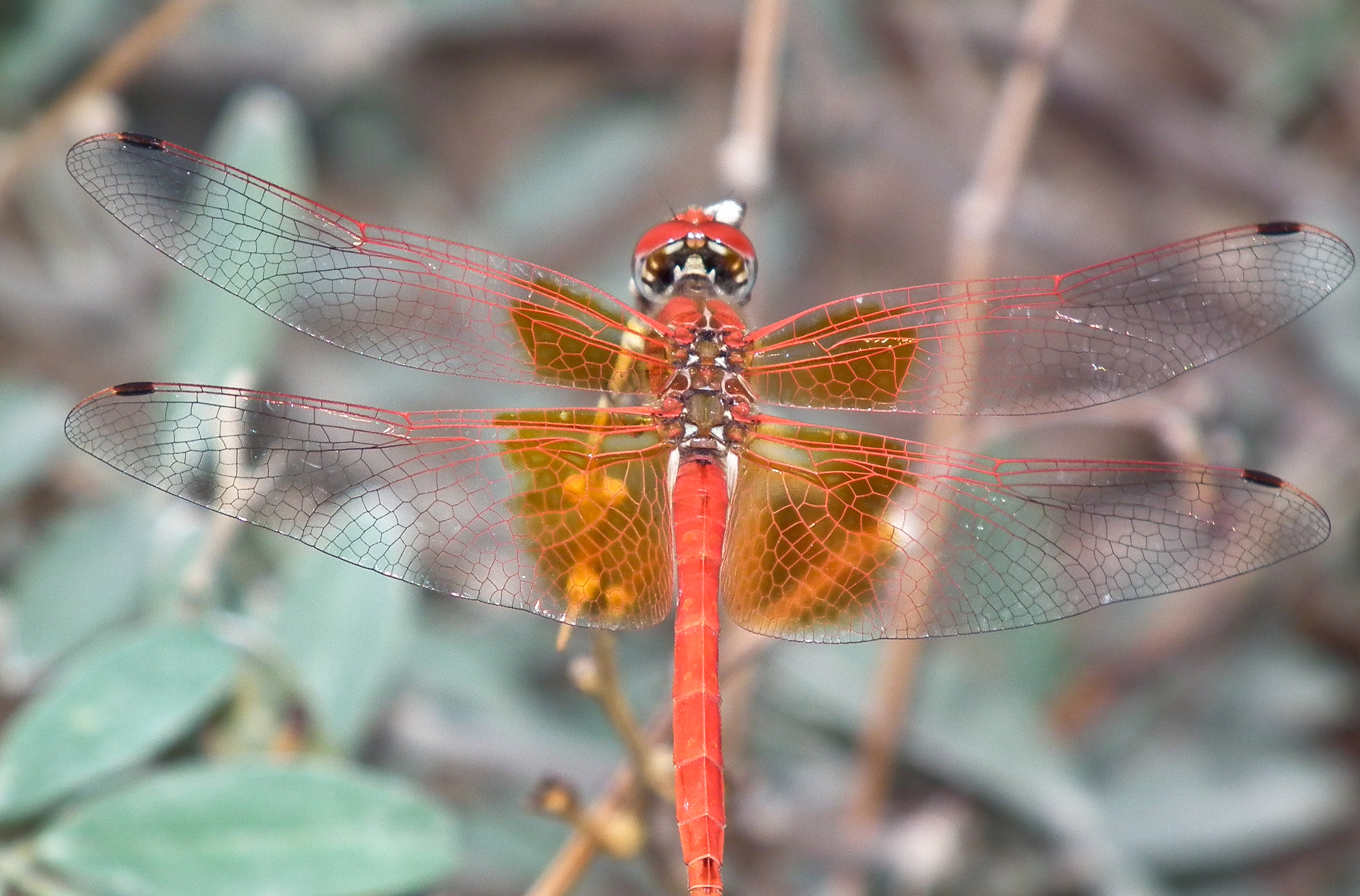
Trithemis kirbyi from United Arab Emirates

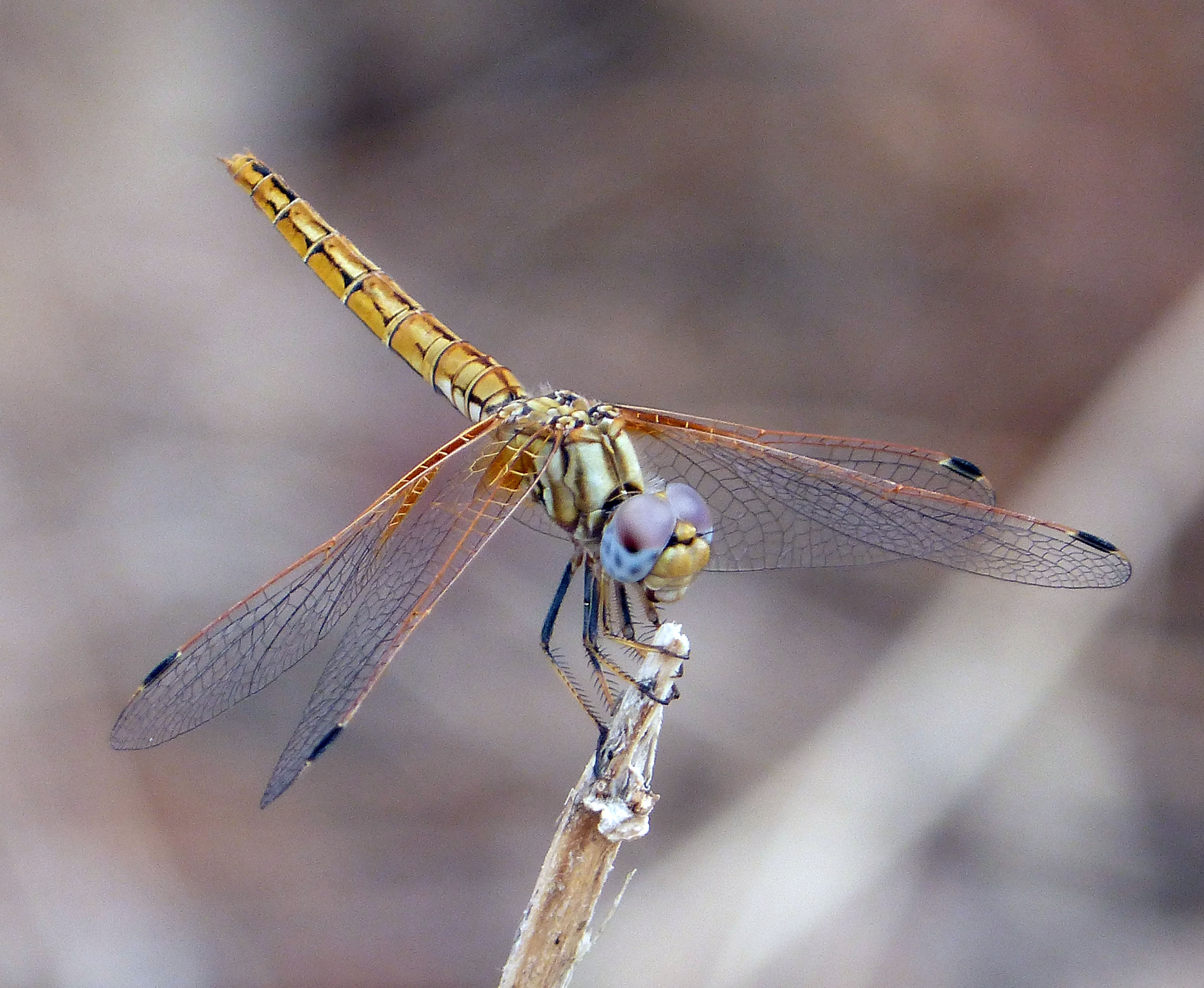
Female

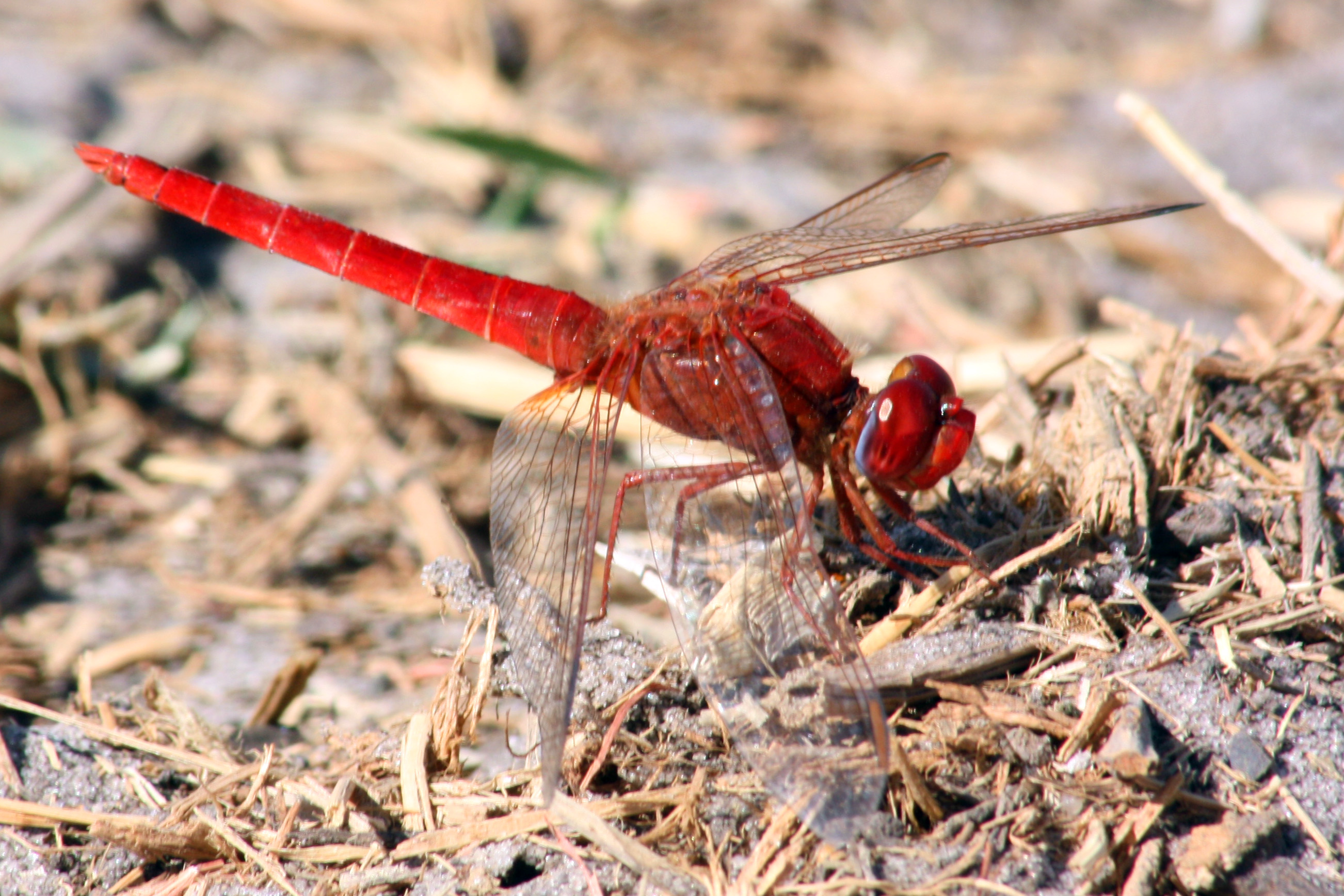
Male, Okavango Delta, Botswana

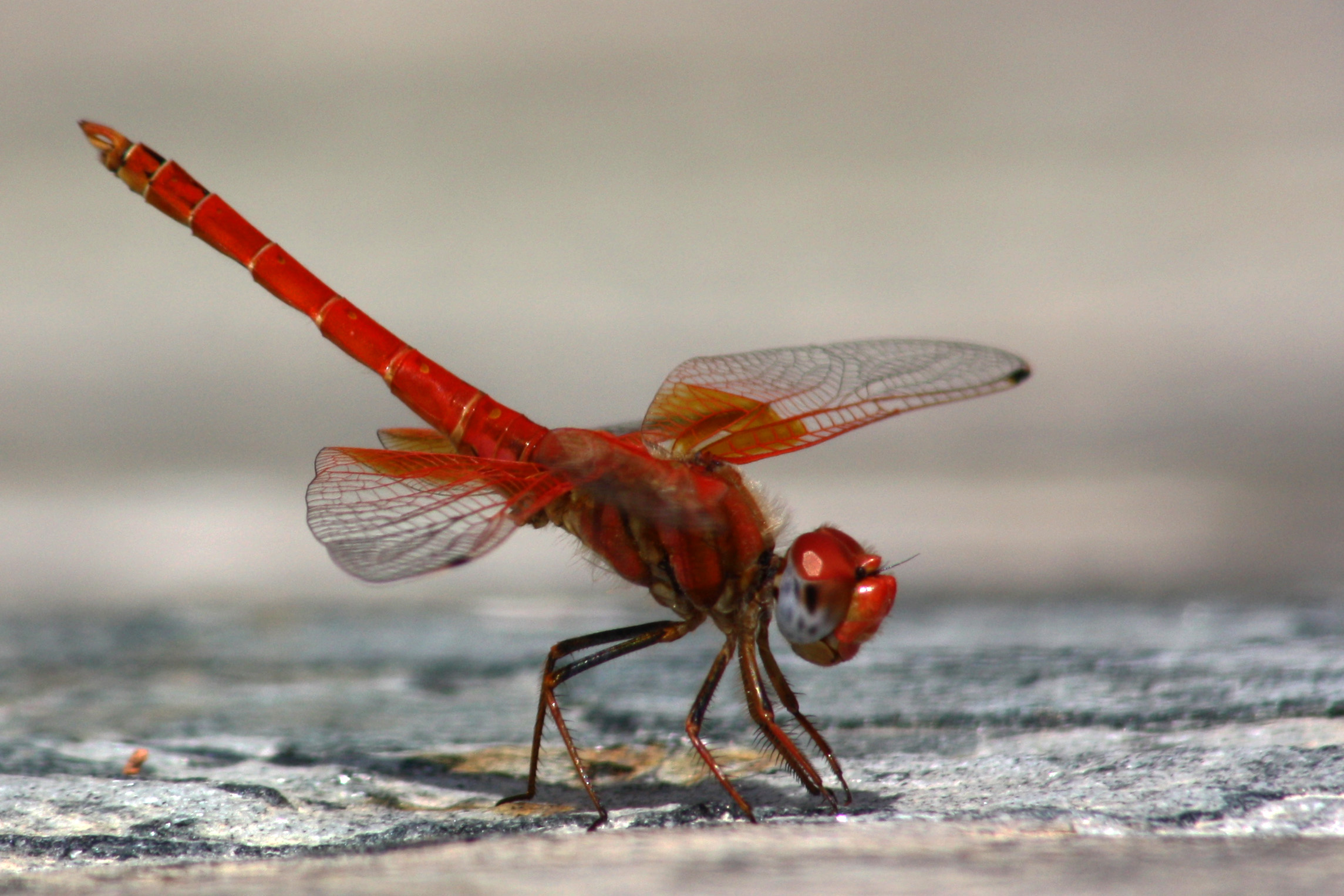
Male, Zighy Bay, Musandam Peninsula, Oman

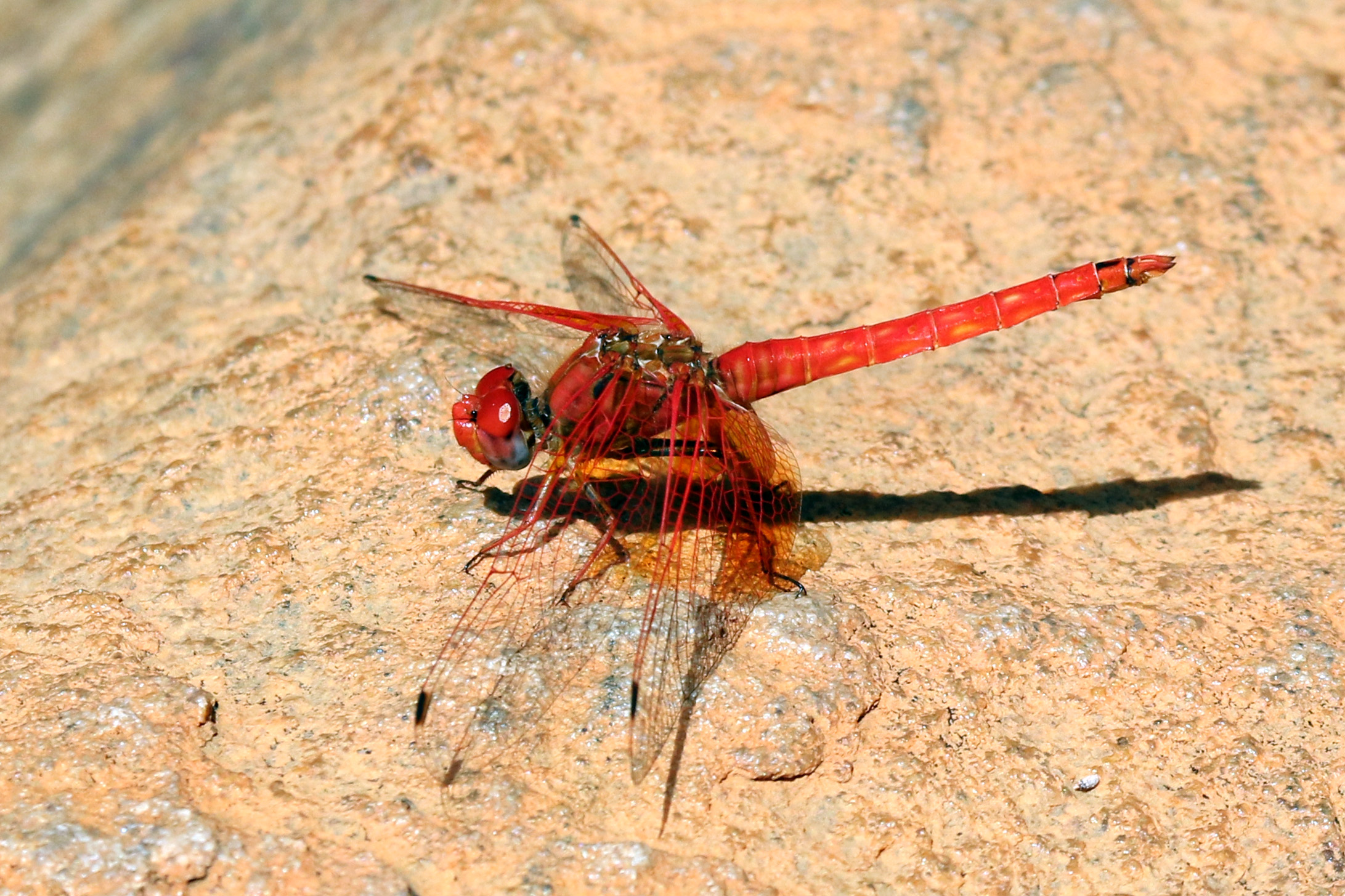
Male, Tswalu Kalahari Reserve, South Africa
