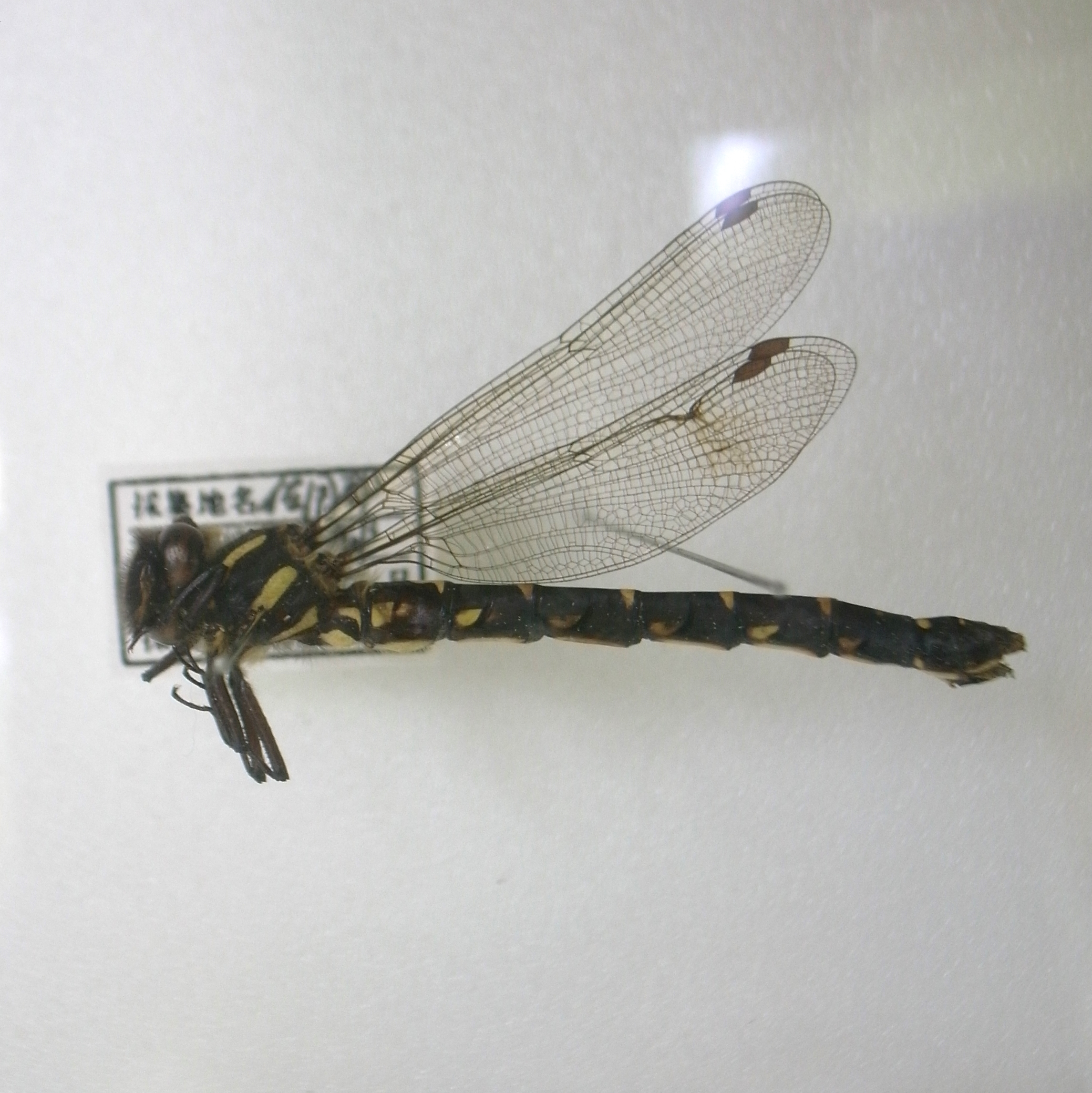
- Epiophlebia superstes adult
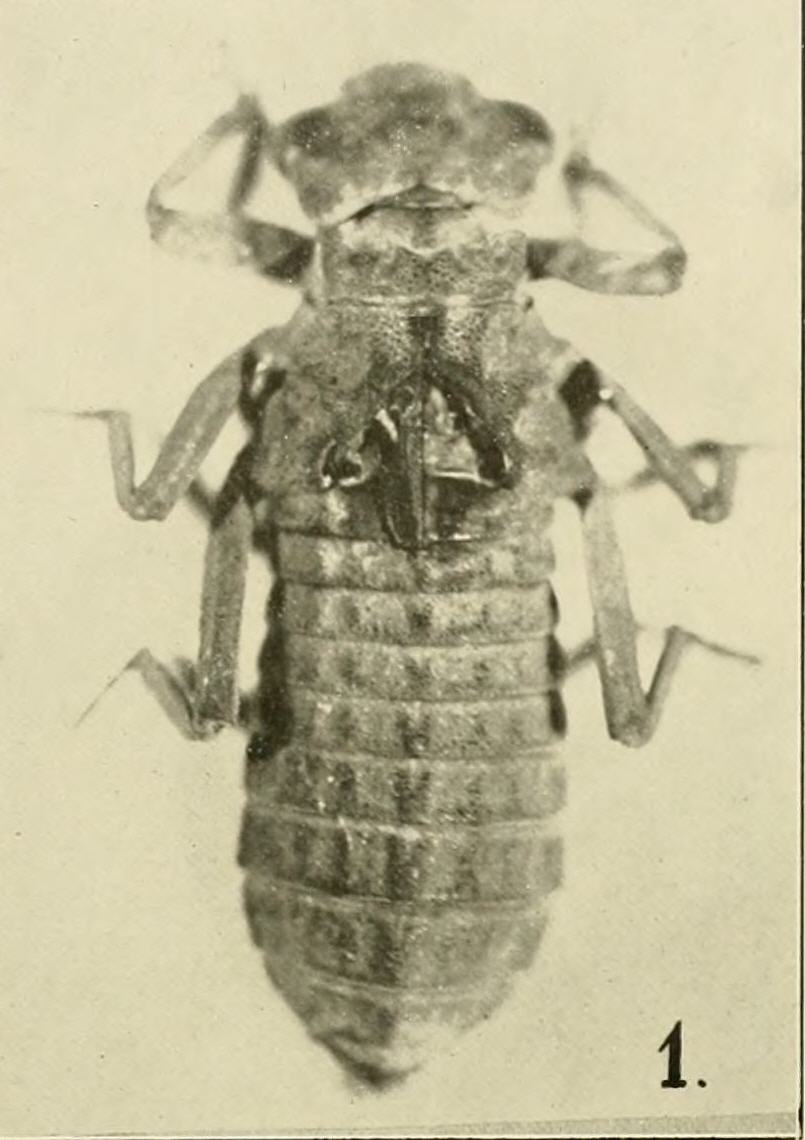
- Epiophlebia laidlawi naiad

Scientific classification
- Kingdom: Animalia
- Phylum: Arthropoda
- Clade: Pancrustacea
- Class: Insecta
- Order: Odonata
- Suborder: Anisozygoptera; Handlirsch, 1906
- Superfamily: Epiophlebioidea; Muttkowski, 1910
- Family: Epiophlebiidae; Muttkowski, 1910
- Genus: Epiophlebia; Calvert, 1903

Species
- Epiophlebia laidlawi; Epiophlebia superstes; Epiophlebia sinensis
- Distribution of Epiophlebia

= Epiophlebia =

Genus of dragonflies

Epiophlebia is a genus of damsel-dragonflies native to the Indian subcontinent, East Asia and Southeast Asia. It is the only living genus of Odonata to be neither a dragonfly nor a damselfly. It is the only known genus of the family Epiophlebiidae, which is itself the only living family in the superfamily Epiophlebioidea and suborder Anisozygoptera, or placed as Epiophlebioptera with Anisoptera, both as infraorders, in suborder Epiprocta. The genus includes three recognised species.

== Description ==
Adult Epiophlebia have a distinctive black-and-yellow striped colouration. Their bodies resemble those of dragonflies, while their wings more closely resemble those of damselflies. The wings are held together over the back when at rest, as in damselflies.

Like dragonfly naiads, the aquatic naiads of Epiophlebia breathe through a rectal chamber, but they have not been observed using the jet-propelled mode of escape found in dragonflies.

Epiophlebia flies relatively clumsily and is less manoeuvrable than dragonflies. It tends to fly rapidly in straight lines in the shade, using fast wingbeats with a wing motion intermediate between those of dragonflies and damselflies.

== Distribution and species ==
Species of Epiophlebia have a disjunct distribution in Asia and occur in small, isolated populations. They inhabit cold mountain streams at altitudes of approximately 1,300 to 3,000 metres (4,300 to 9,800 ft), where water temperatures range from around 4 to 5 °C (39 to 41 °F) in winter to 16 to 17 °C (61 to 63 °F) in summer.

Epiophlebia superstes, the first species described, is found in Japan, while Epiophlebia laidlawi is known from the Himalayas and adjoining parts of Asia, including Nepal, India, Bhutan and China. An unpublished record of an unidentified Epiophlebia larva has also been reported from northern Vietnam.

In 2012, Epiophlebia sinensis was described from Heilongjiang in northeastern China, and material assigned to the species was subsequently reported from North Korea. Its known occurrence appeared to partly bridge the large geographical separation between the Himalayan and Japanese populations. However, the identity and stated origins of the material assigned to E. sinensis have since been questioned.

A fourth species, Epiophlebia diana, was described in 2012 from larval material collected in Sichuan, China. A later morphological reassessment concluded that it was a junior synonym of E. laidlawi, a treatment adopted by the World Odonata List. In 2025, a population from the Hengduan Mountains of Yunnan was described as the subspecies Epiophlebia laidlawi daliensis.

The distribution of the genus may have been more continuous during Pleistocene glacial periods. Ecological niche modelling suggests that suitable habitat may have extended from the Himalayas to Japan during the Last Glacial Maximum, potentially allowing gene flow between populations that are now widely separated.

Three living species are currently recognised. Epiophlebia diana, described from larval specimens collected in China, is treated as a synonym of Epiophlebia laidlawi. The status of Epiophlebia sinensis has also been questioned by molecular evidence, but it remains recognised as a species in the World Odonata List and by Carter et al. (2026).

== Taxonomy and evolution ==
Edmond de Sélys Longchamps originally described the Japanese genus as Palaeophlebia in 1889. Calvert found that this name had already been used by Friedrich Moritz Brauer for a fossil odonate from the Jurassic of eastern Siberia. Because Brauer's name appeared to have priority, Calvert proposed Epiophlebia as a replacement name in 1903. Calvert derived Epiophlebia from the Greek ἐπίων, meaning “coming after” or “following”, and φλέψ, genitive φλεβός, meaning “vein”.

The name Anisozygoptera was established by Anton Handlirsch in 1906 for a group composed largely of fossil odonates. In its traditional broad sense, however, Anisozygoptera does not represent a natural evolutionary group. Phylogenetic studies have found that many of the fossils formerly assigned to it are more closely related to Anisoptera than to the living genus Epiophlebia.

Different classifications have attempted to resolve this problem. One places Epiophlebia in the infraorder Epiophlebioptera and combines it with Anisoptera in the suborder Epiprocta. Another possible treatment is to broaden Anisoptera to include Epiophlebia. Under either arrangement, Anisozygoptera is no longer recognised as a separate living suborder.

Dijkstra et al. (2013) instead retained Anisozygoptera for Epiophlebiidae, arguing that the problems associated with the fossil taxa did not require abandoning the name for the living lineage. This three-suborder arrangement was subsequently adopted by Bybee et al. (2021) and Carter et al. (2026). Carter et al. recommended retaining Anisozygoptera and resolving the polyphyly of its historically included fossils through further subdivision.

Phylogenetic studies have consistently recovered Epiophlebia as the sister group of Anisoptera, making it more closely related to dragonflies than to damselflies. The lineage leading to living Epiophlebia is estimated to have diverged from that of living dragonflies near the end of the Triassic, approximately 205 million years ago.

A genomic study by Suvorov et al. (2022) inferred that the Epiophlebia lineage experienced significant genetic introgression from a damselfly-related source. The study estimated that approximately 67% of its ancestry came from a dragonfly-related ancestor, while the remaining 33% of its ancestry came from a source closely related to the common ancestor of living damselflies, which may explain some of the damselfly-like features of its anatomy. This introgression event is thought to have occurred early in the evolutionary history of the Epiophlebia lineage, shortly after its divergence from the common ancestor of dragonflies.

No fossils have been confidently assigned to the living family Epiophlebiidae. The extinct family Burmaphlebiidae, known from approximately 100-million-year-old mid-Cretaceous Burmese amber, has been proposed as a possible true close relative of Epiophlebia.
