= List of damselflies of the world =

This is a list of damselflies arranged into families.

== Family Amphipterygidae ==
- Amphipteryx agrioides
- Amphipteryx longicaudatus

== Family Calopterygidae ==
See List of damselflies of the world (Calopterygidae)

== Family Chlorocyphidae ==
See List of damselflies of the world (Chlorocyphidae)

== Family Coenagrionidae ==
See List of damselflies of the world (Coenagrionidae)

== Family Coryphagrionidae ==
- Coryphagrion grandis

== Family Devadattidae ==
- Devadatta argyoides
- Devadatta ducatrix
- Devadatta kompieri
- Devadatta multinervosa
- Devadatta podolestoides
- Devadatta yokoii

== Family Dicteriadidae ==
- Dicterias atrosanguinea
- Heliocharis amazona

== Family Euphaeidae ==
See List of damselflies of the world (Euphaeidae)

== Family Hemiphlebiidae ==
- Hemiphlebia mirabilis

== Family Isostictidae ==
See List of damselflies of the world (Isostictidae)

== Family Lestidae ==
See List of damselflies of the world (Lestidae)

== Family Lestoideidae ==
- Diphlebia coerulescens
- Diphlebia euphoeoides
- Diphlebia hybridoides
- Diphlebia lestoides
- Diphlebia nymphoides
- Lestoidea barbarae
- Lestoidea brevicauda
- Lestoidea conjuncta
- Lestoidea lewisiana

== Family Megapodagrionidae ==
See List of damselflies of the world (Megapodagrionidae)

== Family Pentaphlebiidae ==
- Pentaphlebia gamblesi
- Pentaphlebia stahli

== Family Perilestidae ==
- Nubiolestes diotima
- Perilestes attenuatus
- Perilestes bispinus
- Perilestes fragilis
- Perilestes gracillimus
- Perilestes kahli
- Perilestes minor
- Perilestes solutus
- Perissolestes aculeatus
- Perissolestes castor
- Perissolestes cornutus
- Perissolestes flinti
- Perissolestes guianensis
- Perissolestes klugi
- Perissolestes magdalenae
- Perissolestes paprzyckii
- Perissolestes pollux
- Perissolestes remotus
- Perissolestes remus
- Perissolestes romulus

== Family Philogangidae ==
- Philoganga loringae
- Philoganga montana
- Philoganga robusta
- Philoganga vetusta

== Family Platycnemididae ==
See List of damselflies of the world (Platycnemididae)

== Family Platystictidae ==
See List of damselflies of the world (Platystictidae)

== Family Polythoridae ==
See List of damselflies of the world (Polythoridae)

== Family Protoneuridae ==
See List of damselflies of the world (Protoneuridae)

== Family Pseudostigmatidae ==
- Anomisma abnorme
- Mecistogaster amalia
- Mecistogaster amazonica
- Mecistogaster asticta
- Mecistogaster buckleyi
- Mecistogaster jocaste
- Mecistogaster linearis
- Mecistogaster lucretia
- Mecistogaster martinezi
- Mecistogaster modesta
- Mecistogaster ornata
- Mecistogaster pronoti
- Megaloprepus caerulatus
- Microstigma anomalum
- Microstigma maculatum
- Microstigma rotundatum
- Pseudostigma aberrans
- Pseudostigma accedens

== Family Rimanellidae ==
- Rimanella arcana

== Family Synlestidae ==
See List of damselflies of the world (Synlestidae)

== Family Thaumatoneuridae ==
- Thaumatoneura inopinata
