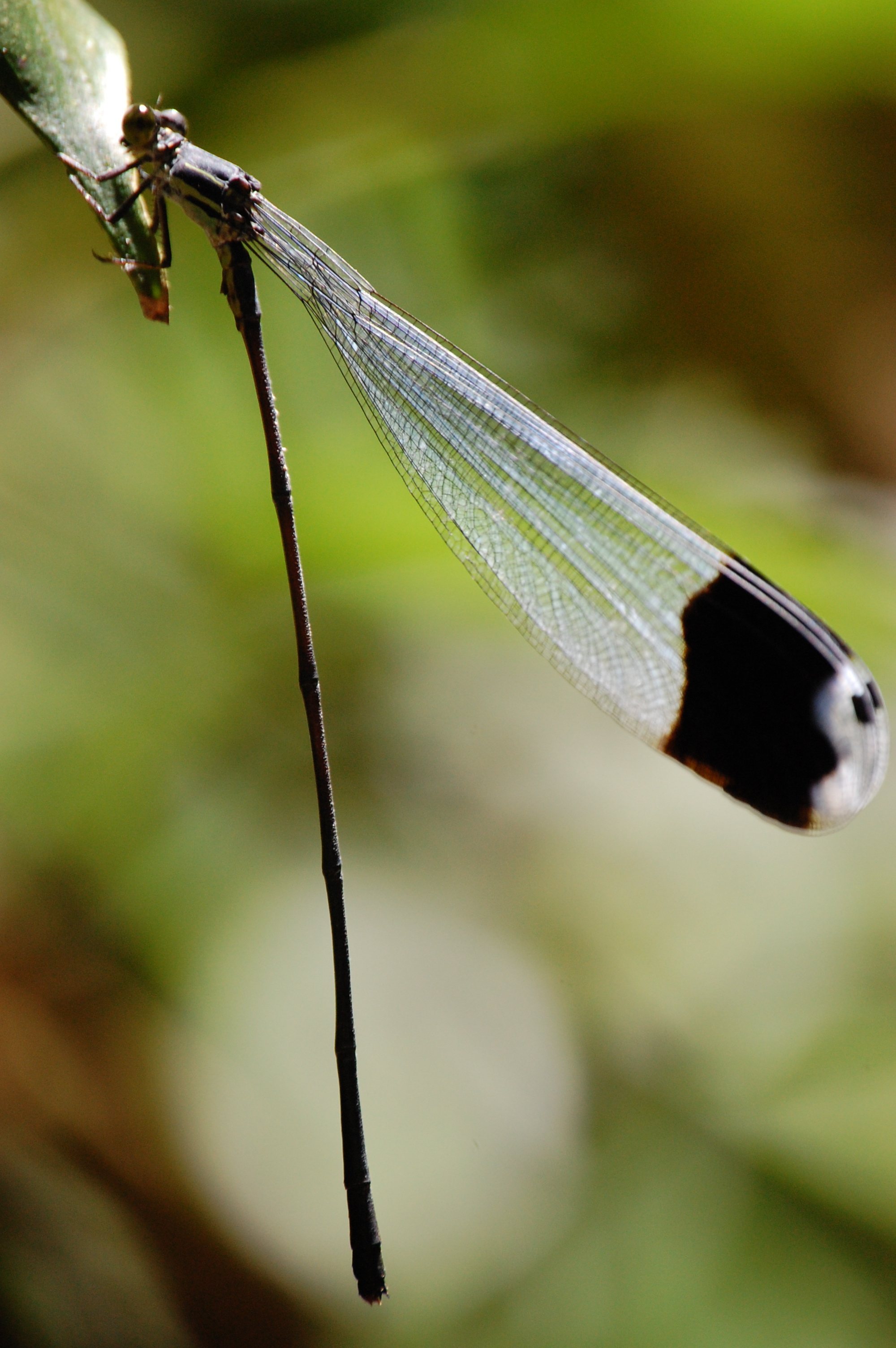
- Female Megaloprepus caerulatus in Costa Rica

Scientific classification
- Kingdom: Animalia
- Phylum: Arthropoda
- Clade: Pancrustacea
- Class: Insecta
- Order: Odonata
- Suborder: Zygoptera
- Family: Coenagrionidae
- Subfamily: Pseudostigmatinae; Tillyard, 1917

Genera
- Anomisma McLachlan, 1877; Coryphagrion Morton, 1924; Mecistogaster Rambur, 1842; Megaloprepus Rambur, 1842; Microstigma Rambur, 1842; Pseudostigma Selys, 1860

= Pseudostigmatinae =

Obsolete subfamily of damselflies

Pseudostigmatinae is an obsolete subfamily of tropical damselflies belonging to the family Coenagrionidae, known as helicopter damselflies, giant damselflies, or forest giants. The subfamily includes the largest of all damselfly species. They specialize in preying on web-building spiders, and breed in phytotelmata, the small bodies of water held by plants such as bromeliads.

This group of damselflies was previously placed in the family Pseudostigmatidae, however, molecular studies have found evidence that this monophyletic group is actually a clade within the family Coenagrionidae.

== Range ==
The species traditionally placed in Pseudostigmatinae are all Neotropical. Two range as far as northeastern Mexico: Mecistogaster ornata occurs in Tamaulipas and Pseudostigma aberrans in both Tamaulipas and Nuevo León.

In 2006, molecular phylogenetic analysis confirmed that the African damselfly Coryphagrion grandis, previously often classified within Megapodagrionidae or in a monotypic family Coryphagrionidae, belonged within family Pseudostigmatidae (now Pseudostigmatinae), close to genus Mecistogaster, as was proposed already ten years before. This finding suggests that the family dates back to before the breakup of the supercontinent Gondwana.

More recent studies, using a denser taxon sampling, have shown this family was paraphyletic, and that C. grandis and New World taxa have rather followed a fantastic ecomorphological convergent evolution.

== Naiad ==
As with other damselflies, the young, known as naiads, have gills and live in fresh water. The tropical forests where pseudostigmatines live typically have few ponds and lakes, so the water that collects in or on plants is an important habitat. Water-filled tree holes and bromeliad tanks are the most dependable and widespread habitats available to pseudostigmatine naiads, and a majority of species use tree holes. Tree hole species are rarely found in bromeliads and vice versa, probably because bromeliad phytotelmata have much higher oxygen content than those in tree holes. One species apparently specializes in bamboo stems that have filled with water after being breached by other insects. In areas where tree holes are uncommon, naiads of a few species can be found in fallen fruit husks, though these phytotelmata may dry out quickly or be overturned by animals. Fallen palm bracts provide an even more unstable habitat, and no pseudostigmatine naiads have ever been found in them. There remain six species known as adults whose larvae have not yet been identified.

The naiads are top predators in their aquatic habitats, feeding on the larvae of mosquitoes and other flies, tadpoles, and the naiads of their own and other odonate species.

== Adult ==
Adults are exceptionally large for damselflies, with wingspans as high as 19 cm (7.5 in.) reported for Megaloprepus and body length up to 13 cm (5.1 in.) for Pseudostigma aberrans. The pterostigma—a thickened, pigmented cell found on the leading edge of the wing in other odonates—is either missing or else modified into a pseudostigma of several cells. In some species the pseudostigma is a large colored spot covering most of the tip of the wing. Mary and William Beebe described the appearance of Mecistogaster flying in the rainforest of Guyana:

Spinning through the aisles made by the giant columns of tree-trunks, were curious translucent pin-wheels .... the wing spots revolved rapidly while the rest of the wings became a mere gray haze.

Adult lifespans as long as seven months have been recorded (in Megaloprepus).

=== Foraging ===
As far as is known, all pseudostigmatines feed on web-building spiders, which they pluck out of their webs. The only recorded exception to this uniform diet is that they occasionally take wrapped prey from a web rather than the spider who wrapped it. Most Odonata are generalist predators; the Pseudostigmatinae may be the only true specialist predators in the order. Spiders provide a large amount of nutrition per unit of prey, and since empty webs are often taken over by other spiders, a pseudostigmatine that learns web locations may be able to take prey from them again and again.

They forage in sun flecks and the gaps created by fallen trees, where there is enough light to see spider webs. Several species have been observed searching for webs by flying up one side of a tree and down the other side. When they locate one they hover in front of it. To catch a spider they first fly backward, then quickly fly forward to grab it in their forelegs. Then they back away again and perch to consume the spider, removing the legs before eating the body. Though this careful forward-and-back approach minimizes contact with the web, they often preen after eating to remove any strands that do adhere to them.

Pseudostigmatines prey on spiders about 3 to 6 mm in body length, avoiding larger ones. They prefer soft-bodied spiders, which can be eaten more quickly. They have never been observed feeding on ground-dwelling spiders, though they do catch web-building spiders that drop to the ground or retreat to a rolled leaf in an attempt to escape. The complex barrier webs that most Nephila spiders build protect them from predation by pseudostigmatines.

=== Reproduction ===
Some species mate opportunistically while foraging in light gaps. In others, males briefly hold mating territories in sunny gaps, or defend a large phytotelma and mate with females who lay eggs there.

All pseudostigmatins have ovipositors capable of cutting into plant tissue to insert eggs, which is the most common mode of oviposition in damselflies. Yet one species, Mecistogaster martinezi, has been observed apparently "tossing" eggs from its abdomen onto the surface of the water while in flight. This behavior may allow the insect to avoid predators such as spiders from which it would otherwise be unable to escape in the small, confined space of a phytotelma. However, Ola Fincke has suggested that the M. martinezi female may simply have been using its long abdomen to test for water in the tree hole before alighting to lay eggs—a behavior observed in a related species—and that the eggs seen floating on the water afterward were laid by mosquitoes.

== Species list ==
The family contains the following species:

- Anomisma abnorme McLachlan, 1877
- Mecistogaster amalia (Burmeister, 1839) – Amalia Helicopter
- Mecistogaster amazonica Sjöstedt, 1918
- Mecistogaster asticta Selys, 1860
- Mecistogaster buckleyi McLachlan, 1881 – Blue-tipped Helicopter
- Mecistogaster jocaste Hagen, 1869
- Mecistogaster linearis (Fabricius, 1776)
- Mecistogaster lucretia (Drury, 1773)
- Mecistogaster martinezi Machado, 1985 (nomen obscurum)
- Mecistogaster modesta Selys, 1860
- Mecistogaster ornata Rambur, 1842 – Ornate Helicopter
- Mecistogaster pronoti Sjöstedt, 1918 – Atlantic Helicopter
- Megaloprepus caerulatus (Drury, 1782)
- Microstigma anomalum Rambur, 1842
- Microstigma maculatum Hagen in Selys, 1860
- Microstigma rotundatum Selys, 1860
- Pseudostigma aberrans Selys, 1860
- Pseudostigma accedens Selys, 1860
