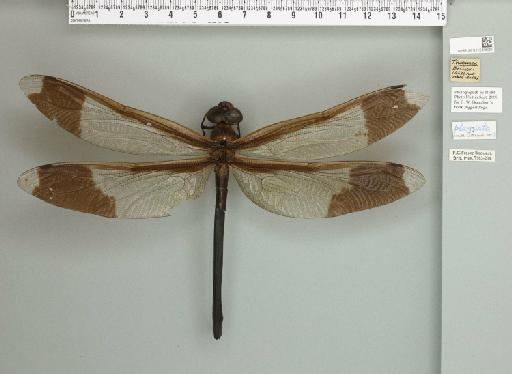

Conservation status
- Least Concern (IUCN 3.1)

Scientific classification
- Kingdom: Animalia
- Phylum: Arthropoda
- Clade: Pancrustacea
- Class: Insecta
- Order: Odonata
- Suborder: Anisoptera
- Family: Aeshnidae
- Genus: Tetracanthagyna
- Species: T. plagiata

Binomial name
- Tetracanthagyna plagiata Waterhouse, 1877

Synonyms
- Gynacantha plagiata Waterhouse, 1877; Tetracanthagyna vittata McLachlan, 1898

= Tetracanthagyna plagiata =

Giant hawker

Species of dragonfly

The giant hawker (Tetracanthagyna plagiata) or the gigantic riverhawker, is a species of dragonfly in the family Aeshnidae. It is found throughout Sundaland, having been recorded on Thailand, Peninsular Malaysia, Singapore, Sumatra, and Borneo. It is the type species for the genus Tetracanthagyna.

It is the heaviest of all living Odonata, and additionally are the second largest of all living odonates by wingspan, second only to Megaloprepus caerulatus (Pseudostigmatidae). T. plagiata is additionally the largest living dragonfly, with a maximum wingspan of 163 millimetres (6.42 in), exceeding the wingspan of runner-up Petalura ingentissima at 162 millimetres (6.38 in).

== Taxonomy ==
Tetracanthagyna plagiata was initially described by Charles Owen Waterhouse in 1877 under the name Gynacantha plagiata, classifying it under the now-separate dragonfly genus Gynacantha, the type locality was listed as Borneo. Robert McLachlan commented that his peer Edmond de Sélys Longchamps proposed the separation of T. plagiata from the other members of the genus Gynacantha as a distinct subspecies that he labelled as Tetracanthagyna. His decision was due to, in his words, the "conformation of the 10th ventral segment in the female." Ferdinand Karsch refused to recognize the proposed classification as a valid subgenus in his 1891 book Kritik des Systems der Aeschniden. However, Robert McLachlan writing in the Transactions of the Royal Entomological Society of London, upon review of the available material stated that "not only is Tetracanthagyna valid, but also that its relationship to Gynacantha is perhaps not so intimate as has been thought." His analysis raised the proposed subgenus of Tetracanthagyna onto the level of a distinct species. With the reclassification of Gynacantha plagiata as Tetracanthagyna plagiata, it was rendered as the newly-erected genus' type species. Commonly known as the "giant hawker", it has also been named the "gigantic riverhawker".

== Description ==
The giant hawker is a large black-bodied dragonfly with large wings. The thorax is black in color, with the side of the synthorax marked with two pale yellowish bands, differentiating it from the reddish brown bands of the related Tetracanthagyna brunnea. The abdomen is reddish-brown in color and cylindrical in shape, with a length of 100 millimetres (3.9 in), and narrowing in size to the tip of the abdomen. Tetracanthagyna plagiata has a variable distal transverse banding pattern on the forewings and hindwings, with males and some females sporting dark costal streaks. Only a few specimens of T. plagiata lack the dark bands. According to Leonard Tan of the blog Singapore Odonata, males lack the transverse brown patches near the wing tips that females have. Apart from differences in wing patterns, males and females of the giant hawker are very similar in appearance.

The giant hawker is sexually dimorphic. Males are smaller than females. Females have a hindwing length of 80-84 millimeters, while males have a hindwing length of 76 millimeters. Females sport a dentigerous plate on their abdomen, a pitchfork-shaped organ used to scoop holes in the surface beneath it or to hold onto the surface during oviposition. Males have a pair of oreillets, lobes which help guide female genitalia into the proper position during mating, on the second abdominal segment.

== Largest dragonfly ==
The giant hawker is the heaviest of all living odonates, the largest living dragonfly (suborder Anisoptera), and the second largest living odonate overall, behind the damselfly Megaloprepus caerulatus. Tetracanthagyna plagiata has been known to reach upwards of 163 millimeters in wingspan, with a body length of 100 millimeters. This puts T. plagiata as being the largest living anisopteran, surpassing Petalura ingentissima at 162 millimeters. There is some uncertainty regarding T. plagiata's weight, with Paulson (2019) stating that there is no weight records available for T. plagiata. However most researchers are generally in agreement that females of T. plagiata are the heaviest living Odonate. Corbet (1999) stated that a male specimen of Tetracanthagyna plagiata had a hindwing span of 144 millimetres (5.7 in). The wingspan of T. plagiata specimens held at the Lee Kong Chian Natural History Museum (formerly the Raffles Museum of Biodiversity Research) were between 134 millimeters and 144 millimeters, with another account putting T. plagiata at a wingspan of 160 millimeters, putting T. plagiata additionally as the largest anisopteran in Southeast Asia.

Regarding the size of T. plagiata, studies by Dorrington (2012) have shown that the practice of aerial predation inhibits further size development of extant anisopterans. Specimens of both the giant hawker and Petalura ingentissima were measured for their hindwing lengths for the aforementioned study. Specimens stored at the Natural History Museum, London had a hindwing length of 84-86 millimeters.

== Life history ==
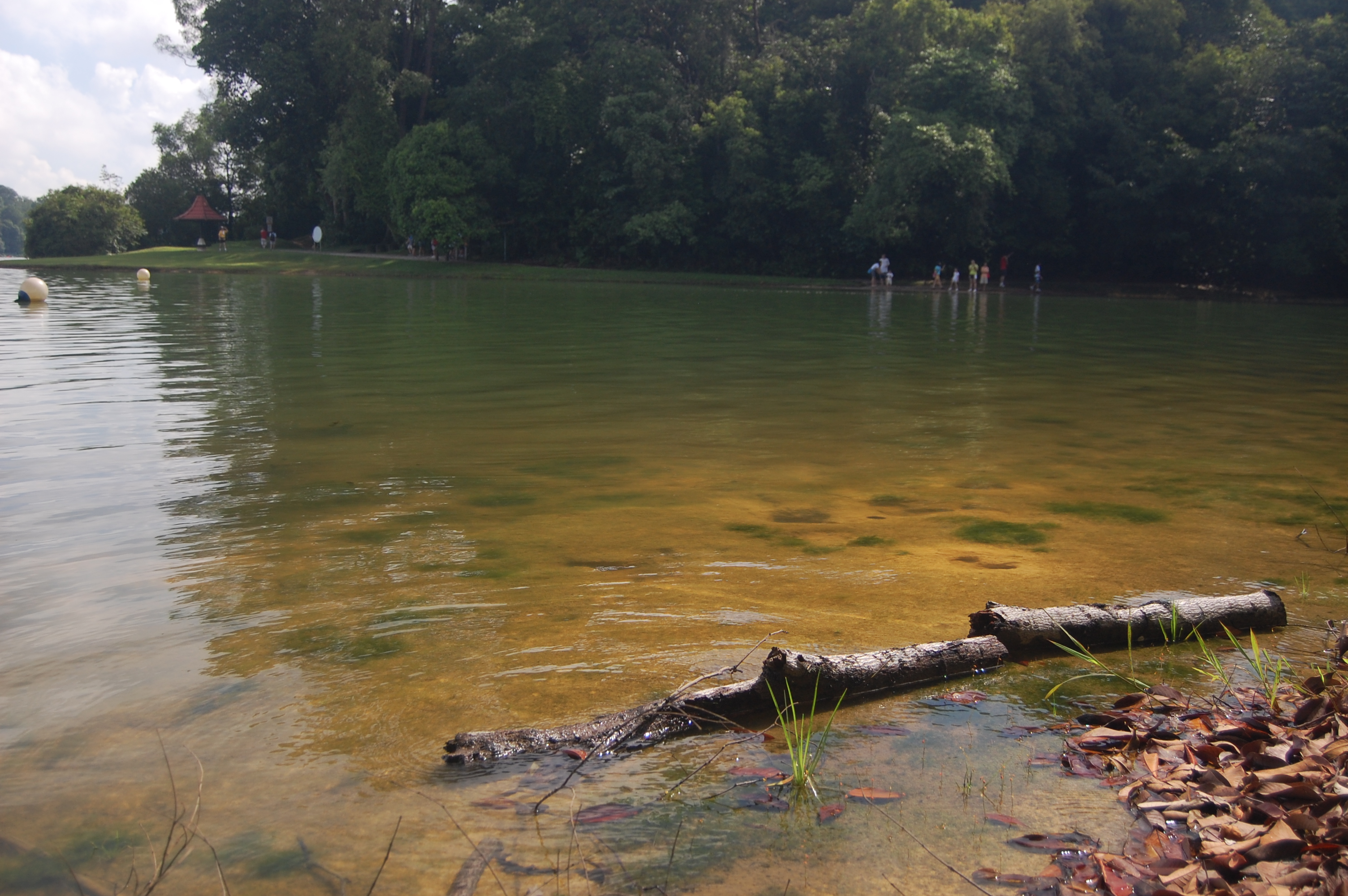
Females of T. plagiata lay their eggs in rotting logs. One female was observed at the MacRitchie Reservoir (pictured), displaying the aforementioned behavior.

Females lay their eggs within rotting logs and other soft substrates covered by moss by streams through inserting their ovipositor into the rotten log. Before doing so, the female would scrape at the surface for a minute to prepare the surface while arching its abdomen. One female was spotted by the MacRitchie Reservoir displaying the aforementioned behavior. Watanabe (2003) recorded a female T. plagiata depositing its eggs into decaying wood, 150 centimeters above the water's surface.

The larvae of Tetracanthagyna plagiata were previously unknown to science, unlike the larvae of related species. Studies of the related Tetracanthagyna waterhousei in Hong Kong recorded larval predation of fish and its eclosion from the larval exuviae. Follow up studies conducted in 2010 by Orr et al. using larvae identified using exuviae and collected from slow-moving forest streams from which adult specimens of T. plagiata were observed emerging, those identified by their large comparative size and distinctive sculpturing. Larvae were found within Singapore's Central Catchment Nature Reserve at two separate sites (the MacRitchie Reservoir and the Nee Soon Swamp Forest). In captivity, larvae were reared on live shrimp (Macrobrachium lanchesteri), small fish, or tubifex worms (Tubifex tubifex). It is believed that the larvae feed on the shrimp species Macrobrachium trompii and Caridina temasek, as well as catfish, cyprinids, halfbeaks, and tadpoles in the wild. The anatomy of the labial palps suggest a specialization towards predation of larger prey items. Unlike the larvae of other members of the genus Tetracanthagyna, the larvae of the giant hawker are ambush predators rather than actively hunting their prey, concealing themselves by resembling a stick as they wait for prey. The larvae also exhibit ballistic defecation, whereby the larvae would shoot their excrement, a tactic likely to avoid detection by potential prey items due to a cloud of contaminant fecal matter.

Orr et al., in the first ever larval description for a T. plagiata nymph, described the larva as a large elongate aeshnid larva. The outline of the larva was primarily angular, and it had a "distinctive, pronounced" sculpturing on its head. The banded coloration on its legs was the only deviation from its dark appearance. The larva's legs were short and robust, which were adapted for performing grasping. The larval mask (a hinged lower mandible also known as a "hinged labium") had a robust prementum with distal expansion, and the short, thin labial palps had serrated inner margins along its terminal hook. Male exuviae were 57.5 millimetres (2.26 in) long, and those of the female were 62 millimetres (2.4 in) long. Compared to the larvae of related species Tetracanthagyna waterhousei and Tetracanthagyna degorsi, T. plagiata's larvae had a more angular head.

Adult dragonflies forage during the dawn and dusk and are attracted to lights. Akin to other members of the family Aeshnidae, they display a crepuscular lifestyle, flying during the twilight period.

== Distribution ==
The giant hawker is found throughout the Oriental region of Southeast Asia, throughout the biogeographical region of Sundaland. It is found in the countries of Thailand, Malaysia, Singapore, Brunei, and Indonesia.

Frank Fortescue Laidlaw (1901) described T. plagiata as being recorded on the islands of Sumatra and Borneo. René Martin (1909) described T. plagiata as being found in Borneo, Sumatra, and Malacca. M. A. Lieftinck (1954) stated that T. plagiata was also found in Singapore, where it is the only member of the genus Tetracanthagyna on the island. It has also been recorded in the state of Johor on Peninsular Malaysia.

=== Habitat ===
Male larvae were found in slow-moving streams within secondary forests. The streams were about 1 metre (3 ft 3 in) wide and 0.6 metres (2 ft 0 in) deep, with a substrate composed of a mix of sand and mud. Streams in which Tetracanthagyna plagiata larvae were observed contained organic matter, including tree branches and leaf litter. Female larvae are found in similar conditions, with vegetation such as sedges and ferns within the stream habitat in addition to trees providing shade. Adults are found in primary and secondary lowland forests.

== Threats and conservation ==
Tetracanthagyna plagiata was assessed in 2010 by the IUCN Red List as being of Least Concern. The IUCN report stated that T. plagiata was potentially threatened by logging in its habitat, environmental degradation by mining developments, and by wood and pulp plantations.

In a survey of odonates conducted at nature reserves within Singapore, D.H. Murphy listed the species as "rare" within the Nee Soon Swamp Forest of Singapore. Y. Norma-Rashid corroborates upon this account, listing the species as "rare" on a checklist of Singaporean dragonflies. Murphy additionally stated that his report was an "old record". He proceeded to describe the giant hawker as "totally confined" within Nee Soon Swamp Forest. Leong et al. subsequently reported that the giant hawker has been seen multiple times outside of the Nee Soon Swamp Forest, being found within the broader context of the Central Catchment Nature Reserve within Singapore. In a 2016 revision of Murphy's previous work and an update of the national conservation status for various odonata, T. plagiata was listed as "Restricted & Uncommon", receiving the designation of "Vulnerable".

== See also ==
- Meganeuropsis permiana and Meganeura monyi, prehistoric griffinflies
- Megaloprepus caerulatus, the largest odonate by wingspan at 191 millimeters
- Petalura ingentissima, the second largest anisopteran at a wingspan of 162 millimeters, longest in terms of body length at 125 millimeters
- Mecistogaster lucretia, the longest odonate by body length at 150 millimeters
- Chlorogomphus papilio, the odonate with the largest wing area with a maximum breadth of 35 millimeters
