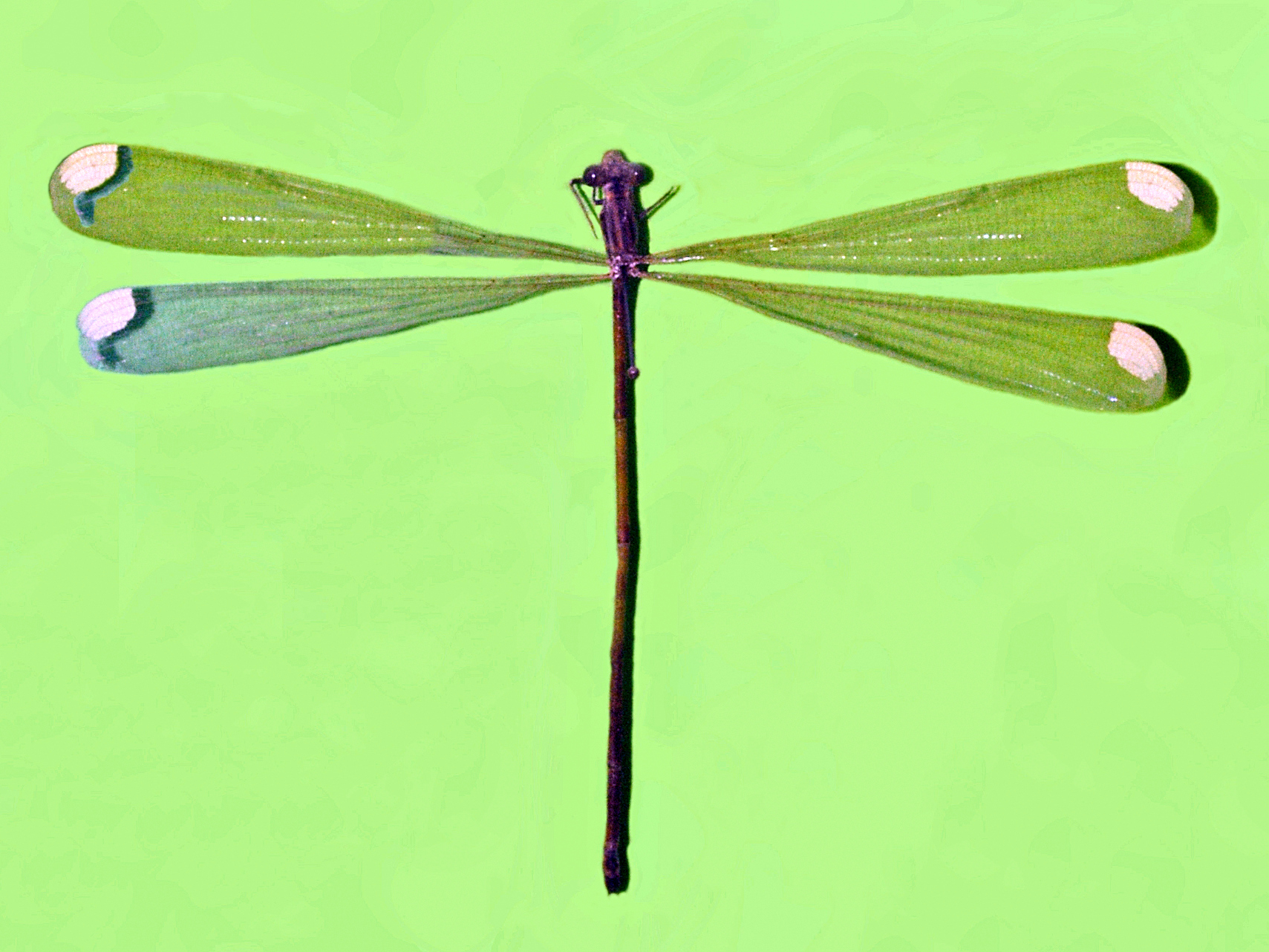
- Microstigma rotundatum

Scientific classification
- Kingdom: Animalia
- Phylum: Arthropoda
- Class: Insecta
- Order: Odonata
- Suborder: Zygoptera
- Family: Coenagrionidae
- Subfamily: Pseudostigmatinae
- Genus: Microstigma; Rambur, 1842

= Microstigma (damselfly) =

Genus of damselflies

Microstigma is a genus of damselflies belonging to the family Coenagrionidae.

== Species ==
- Microstigma anomalum Rambur, 1842
- Microstigma maculatum Hagen in Selys, 1860
- Microstigma rotundatum Selys, 1860
