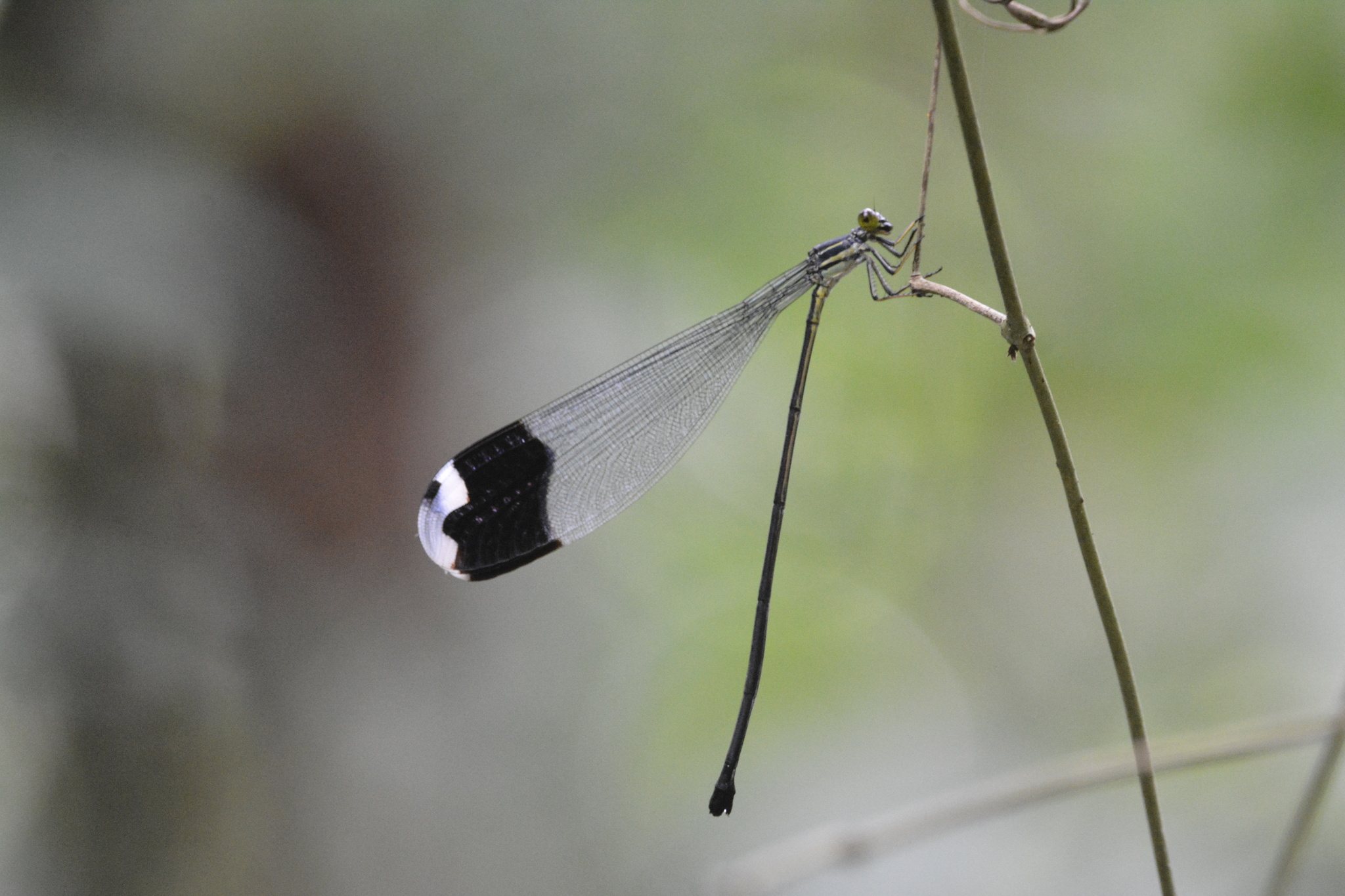
- Megaloprepus diaboli

Scientific classification
- Kingdom: Animalia
- Phylum: Arthropoda
- Class: Insecta
- Order: Odonata
- Suborder: Zygoptera
- Family: Coenagrionidae
- Genus: Megaloprepus; Rambur, 1842

= Megaloprepus =

Genus of damselflies

Megaloprepus is a genus of large Neotropical damselflies in the family Coenagrionidae, commonly known as helicopter damsels. There are four species distributed from Mexico to Ecuador and Peru.

Species include:

- Megaloprepus brevistigma Selys, 1860
- Megaloprepus caerulatus (Drury, 1782)
- Megaloprepus diaboli Feindt & Hadrys, 2022
- Megaloprepus latipennis Selys, 1860
