= Coryphagrion grandis =

Conservation status
- Vulnerable (IUCN 3.1)

Scientific classification
- Kingdom: Animalia
- Phylum: Arthropoda
- Clade: Pancrustacea
- Class: Insecta
- Order: Odonata
- Suborder: Zygoptera
- Superfamily: Coenagrionoidea
- Family: Coenagrionidae
- Genus: Coryphagrion
- Species: C. grandis

Binomial name
- Coryphagrion grandis Morton, 1924

Species of damselfly

Coryphagrion grandis is a species of damselfly found in coastal forests and on the lower slopes of the Eastern Arc Mountains in Kenya, Tanzania and Mozambique. Its monotypic genus Coryphagrion is a member of the family Coenagrionidae. It was once placed within the family Pseudostigmatidae, whose other members are all Neotropical, but further studies showed this family was paraphyletic.
