= Mecistogaster martinezi =

Scientific classification
- Kingdom: Animalia
- Phylum: Arthropoda
- Class: Insecta
- Order: Odonata
- Suborder: Zygoptera
- Family: Coenagrionidae
- Genus: Mecistogaster
- Species: M. martinezi

Binomial name
- Mecistogaster martinezi Machado, 1985

Species of damselfly

Mecistogaster martinezi is a species of damselfly in the family Coenagrionidae.
