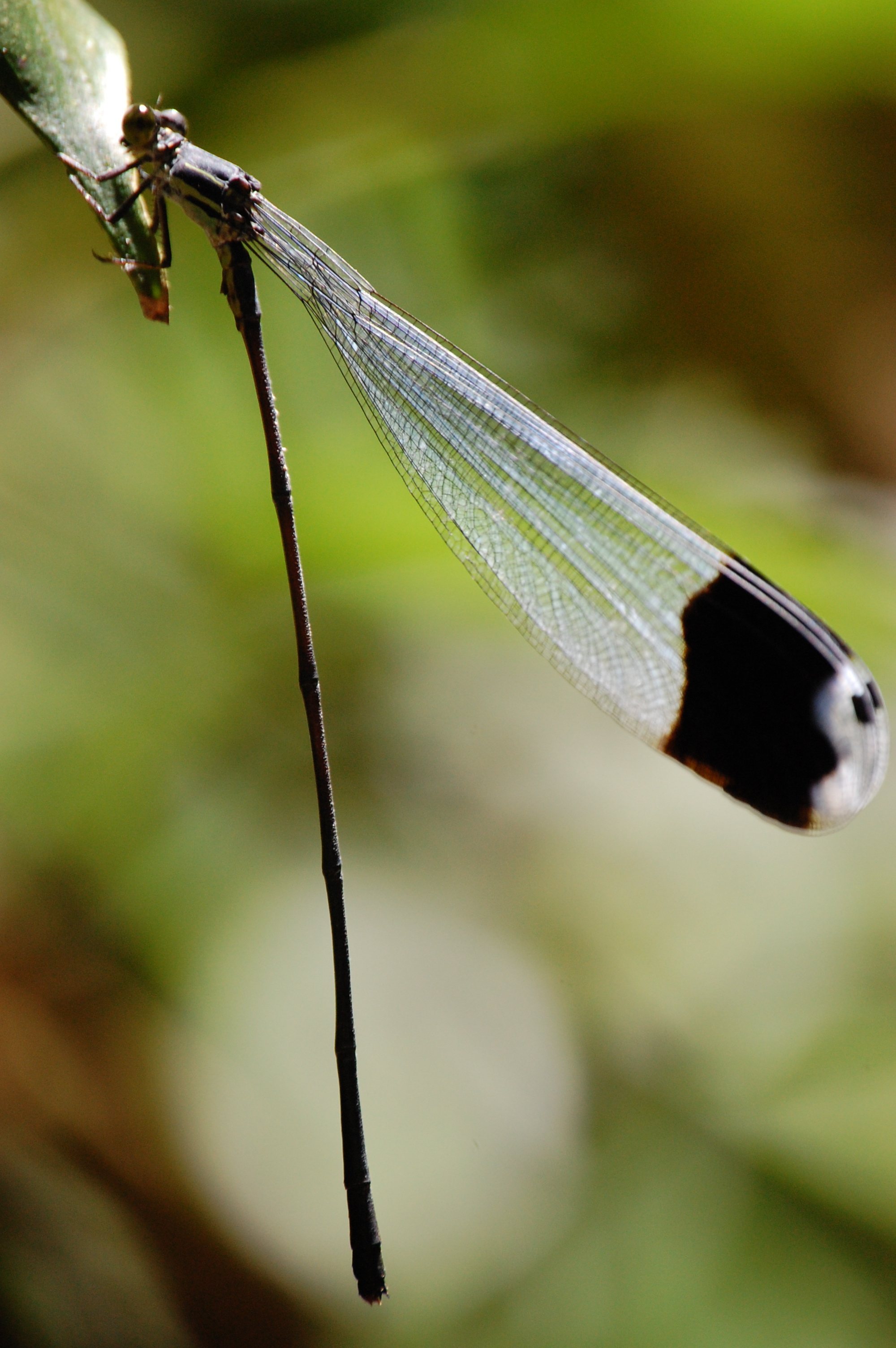
- female M. caerulatus in Costa Rica

Conservation status
- Least Concern (IUCN 3.1)

Scientific classification
- Kingdom: Animalia
- Phylum: Arthropoda
- Class: Insecta
- Order: Odonata
- Suborder: Zygoptera
- Family: Coenagrionidae
- Genus: Megaloprepus; Rambur, 1842
- Species: M. caerulatus

Binomial name
- Megaloprepus caerulatus (Drury, 1782)

= Megaloprepus caerulatus =

Species of damselfly

Megaloprepus caerulatus, also known as the blue-winged helicopter, is a forest giant damselfly of the family Coenagrionidae. Forest giant damselflies were previously recognized as their own family, Pseudostigmatidae. M. caerulatus is found in wet and moist forests in Central and South America. It has the greatest wingspan of any living damselfly or dragonfly, up to 19 centimetres (7.5 in) in the largest males. Its large size and the markings on its wings make it a conspicuous species; a hovering Megaloprepus has been described as a "pulsating blue-and-white beacon".

As an adult it feeds on orb-weaver spiders in the forest understory, which it plucks from their webs. It lays its eggs in water-filled holes in trees; males defend the larger holes as breeding territories. The naiad is a top predator in its tree-hole habitat, feeding on tadpoles and aquatic insects, including the larvae of mosquito species that are vectors of human disease.

== Egg and naiad ==
Megaloprepus lays its eggs in the water that collects in tree hollows. These plant-borne bodies of water, known as phytotelmata, may form in a living tree when a branch breaks off or a burl rots and fills with water, in buttresses of some trees that hold water including the common Pentaclethra macroloba, or indentations in a trunk may fill with water after the tree falls. The eggs hatch in a minimum of 18 days, but the hatching of eggs laid on the same day is spread out over as much as half a year. This extreme variation in hatching time—unknown in any other damselfly but present in some mosquito species—increases the chance that some eggs will hatch when no predator is present.

As with other damselflies, the young—known as naiads, nymphs, or larvae—are carnivorous. The most ubiquitous prey in the tree holes they inhabit are mosquito larvae, but they will also feed on tadpoles, syrphid fly and chironomid fly larvae, and other odonate (dragonfly and damselfly) naiads. The three leaflike caudal lamellae at the end of the abdomen, which serve as gills, are broad and elaborately folded, an adaptation to intermittent low oxygen availability in its habitat. Each lamella has a conspicuous white spot, making Megaloprepus easy to distinguish from other tree-hole damselflies.

As many as 13 females may oviposit in a single large tree hole, laying up to 250 eggs each, but the numbers of naiads are reduced by cannibalism. Even when there is a high concentration of other prey, Megaloprepus naiads still kill each other until a density of one naiad per 1-2 liters of water is reached. They are not territorial, but larger individuals displace smaller ones; their aggressive behavior includes raising and swinging the caudal lamellae and striking with the labium, the hinged, extensible lower "lip" that odonate naiads use to catch prey.

== Adult ==
The adult's body is dark brown or black and has yellowish markings. The wings are hyaline (transparent), with a dark blue band on the outer third. Females have a milky-tinged patch at the tip of each wing, while males of most populations have a white band just inside the blue one.

In 1923, Philip Calvert described Megaloprepus in flight:

When flying the four wings are spread quite far apart, fore and hind wing of the same side far apart, body horizontal. Flight slow enough so that the movements of each separate wing can be seen—insect consequently moves slowly but can dodge. Mr. Barnes compared the movements of the wings to that of a windmill, but the revolving movements are lacking; I should say the effect produced by the wings is more like that of a jumping-jack with moveable arms and legs pulled by one string, rather slowly, but, of course, at regular intervals.

It is one of the few species in order Odonata in which males are larger than females, with abdomens up to 10 cm (4 in.) long and wingspans of up to 19 cm (7.5 in.)—the greatest wingspan of all odonates. Size varies geographically; Megaloprepus on Barro Colorado Island in Panama are smaller than those at La Selva Biological Station in Costa Rica or Los Tuxtlas field station in the Mexican state of Veracruz.

Adult lifespans as long as 7 months have been recorded.

=== Foraging ===
Like other pseudostigmatid damselflies, Megaloprepus feeds on web-building spiders. It forages in areas that receive direct sun, such as the gaps created by fallen trees or branches; the light helps it avoid becoming entangled. When it finds a web, it hovers in front of it until it locates the spider. Then it flies backward and quickly darts forward again to grab the spider in its forelegs. Finally it backs away and perches to consume the spider, removing the legs before eating the body.

=== Reproduction ===
Most tree holes contain less than a liter of water, but some can hold as much as 50 liters. Male Megaloprepus defend these larger holes as breeding territories, mating with females who come to the tree hole to oviposit.

Several factors make large tree holes more valuable to Megaloprepus than small ones. Not only can their greater volume accommodate more naiads at a time, they have a higher density of prey in the form of tadpoles and mosquito larvae; this allows the naiads to grow more rapidly and reach adulthood sooner. In forests with a dry season, larger tree holes can last nearly a month longer before drying out completely. As a result, large tree holes can produce three cohorts per season, totalling perhaps a few dozen new adults, while only one or two emerge from a small hole. Large tree holes also give Megaloprepus better chances of surviving to emerge if one of its slower-growing relatives in genus Mecistogaster is already present. In a tree hole small enough to be effectively patrolled by a single naiad, the first species to hatch is likely to eat all newcomers, but in a large one Megaloprepus can escape long enough to outgrow and eventually eat an older resident. Finally, probably due to the greater abundance of prey, larger tree holes produce larger males that will be better able to defend a territory themselves when they reach reproductive maturity.

A territorial male drives away other males from his territory by chasing and sometimes hitting them. He does not allow females to lay eggs in the hole he defends without mating with him first, but he does not pursue females who opt instead to leave the scene. The structure of the penis suggests that, as with many other odonates, male Megaloprepus are able to displace sperm from previous matings, ensuring the paternity of the eggs. For their part, females do not choose mates based on size, and will sometimes remate with smaller males who cannot take over a territory and instead adopt a satellite position nearby. At least some females will lay eggs in undefended tree holes before mating again.

== Conservation ==
Megaloprepus avoids flying across large clearings that lack shaded perches, and has poor flight endurance, achieving a maximum distance of less than 1 km when experimentally released over water. This may limit its dispersal ability, making it particularly vulnerable to habitat fragmentation. While it can breed in secondary forest, it is less common there than in old-growth forest, even when the two are adjacent. Since Megaloprepus reduces the number of adult mosquitoes that emerge from tree holes it inhabits, and some of the species it preys on are important disease vectors, its conservation may have human health implications.

== See also ==
- List of largest insects
