= Anomisma =

Scientific classification
- Kingdom: Animalia
- Phylum: Arthropoda
- Class: Insecta
- Order: Odonata
- Suborder: Zygoptera
- Family: Coenagrionidae
- Genus: Anomisma; McLachlan, 1877
- Species: A. abnorme

Binomial name
- Anomisma abnorme McLachlan, 1877

Genus of damselflies

Anomisma is a genus of damselflies in the family Coenagrionidae. The only described species in Anomisma is Anomisma abnorme.
