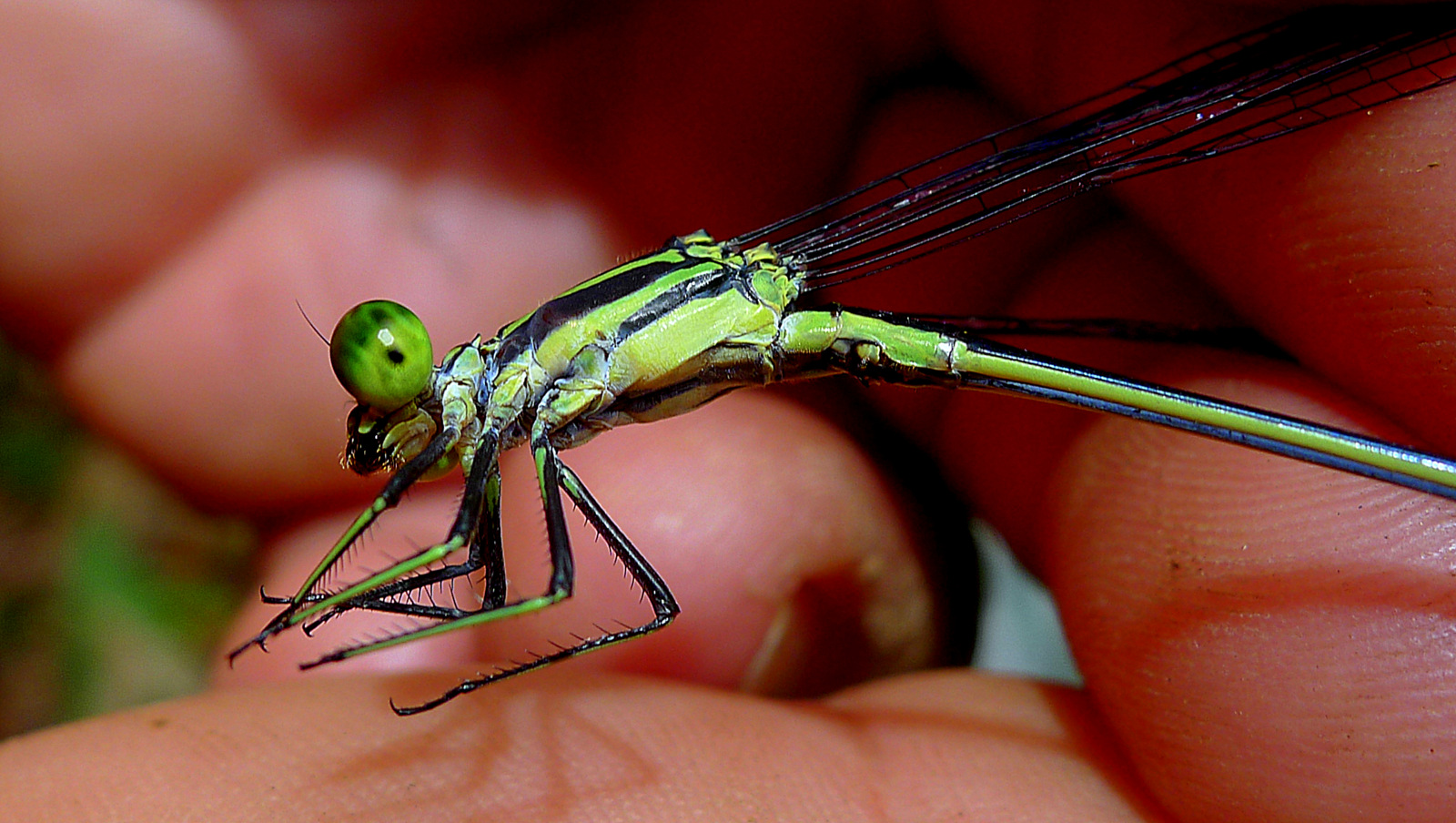

Conservation status
- Least Concern (IUCN 3.1)

Scientific classification
- Kingdom: Animalia
- Phylum: Arthropoda
- Class: Insecta
- Order: Odonata
- Suborder: Zygoptera
- Family: Coenagrionidae
- Genus: Mecistogaster
- Species: M. amalia

Binomial name
- Mecistogaster amalia (Burmeister, 1839)

= Mecistogaster amalia =

Species of damselfly

Mecistogaster amalia is a species of damselfly in the family Coenagrionidae, known commonly as the Amalia helicopter. It is endemic to Brazil, where it lives in the Atlantic rainforest.
