= Mecistogaster jocaste =

Scientific classification
- Domain: Eukaryota
- Kingdom: Animalia
- Phylum: Arthropoda
- Class: Insecta
- Order: Odonata
- Suborder: Zygoptera
- Family: Coenagrionidae
- Genus: Mecistogaster
- Species: M. jocaste

Binomial name
- Mecistogaster jocaste Hagen, 1869

Species of damselfly

Mecistogaster jocaste is a species of damselfly in the family Coenagrionidae. It is found in South America.

== Subspecies ==
These five subspecies belong to the species Mecistogaster jocaste:

- Mecistogaster jocaste jocaste Hagen, 1869
- Mecistogaster jocaste sincera McLachlan, 1877
- Mecistogaster jocaste sincerus McLachlan, 1877
- Mecistogaster jocaste vicentius Ris, 1918
- Mecistogaster jocaste vincentius Ris, 1918
