= Mecistogaster buckleyi =

Conservation status
- Least Concern (IUCN 3.1)

Scientific classification
- Kingdom: Animalia
- Phylum: Arthropoda
- Clade: Pancrustacea
- Class: Insecta
- Order: Odonata
- Suborder: Zygoptera
- Family: Coenagrionidae
- Genus: Mecistogaster
- Species: M. buckleyi

Binomial name
- Mecistogaster buckleyi McLachlan, 1881

Species of damselfly

Mecistogaster buckleyi is a species of damselfly in the family Coenagrionidae. It is found in South America.

The IUCN conservation status of Mecistogaster buckleyi is "LC", least concern, with no immediate threat to the species' survival. The status was reviewed in 2009.
