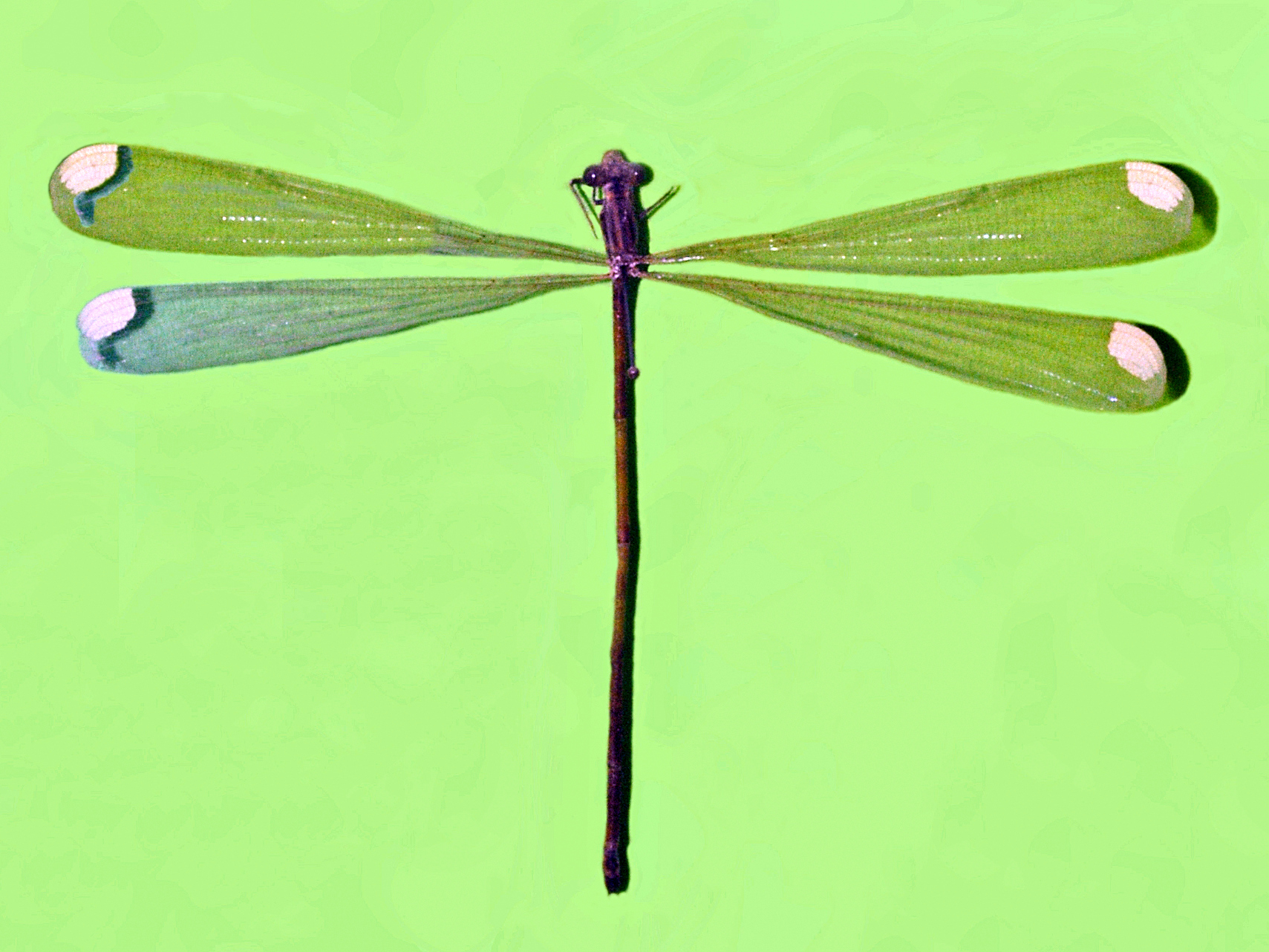
- Microstigma rotundatum. Museum specimen

Scientific classification
- Kingdom: Animalia
- Phylum: Arthropoda
- Clade: Pancrustacea
- Class: Insecta
- Order: Odonata
- Suborder: Zygoptera
- Family: Coenagrionidae
- Genus: Microstigma
- Species: M. rotundatum

Binomial name
- Microstigma rotundatum Selys, 1860

Synonyms
- Microstigma exustum (Selys, 1860); Microstigma lunatum (Selys, 1860)

= Microstigma rotundatum =

Species of damselfly

Microstigma rotundatum, the helicopter damselfly, is a species of damselfly belonging to the family Coenagrionidae.

== Description ==
These damselflies have a long, thin body and large wings with a dense venation. The apex of the forewings has large yellow flecks and the pseudostigma shows many cells.

== Biology ==
These damselflies mainly prey on web-building spiders. Larvae develop in water-filled crevices of fallen trees and in phytotelmata, the bodies of water held by some plants (bromeliads).

== Distribution and habitat ==
This species is present in South America (Peru, Ecuador, Colombia, Venezuela, Bolivia, Amazonas). It lives in tropical primary lowland forests.

== Bibliography ==
- de Selys Longchamps, E. (1860) Synopsis des Agrionines. Première légion: Pseudostigma., Bulletin Academie royale Belgique Serie 2 10 (6): 9-27.
- Odonata: Catalogue of the Odonata of the World. Tol J. van.
