= Mecistogaster amazonica =

Scientific classification
- Domain: Eukaryota
- Kingdom: Animalia
- Phylum: Arthropoda
- Class: Insecta
- Order: Odonata
- Suborder: Zygoptera
- Family: Coenagrionidae
- Genus: Mecistogaster
- Species: M. amazonica

Binomial name
- Mecistogaster amazonica Sjöstedt, 1918

Species of damselfly

Mecistogaster amazonica is a species of narrow-winged damselfly in the family Coenagrionidae.
