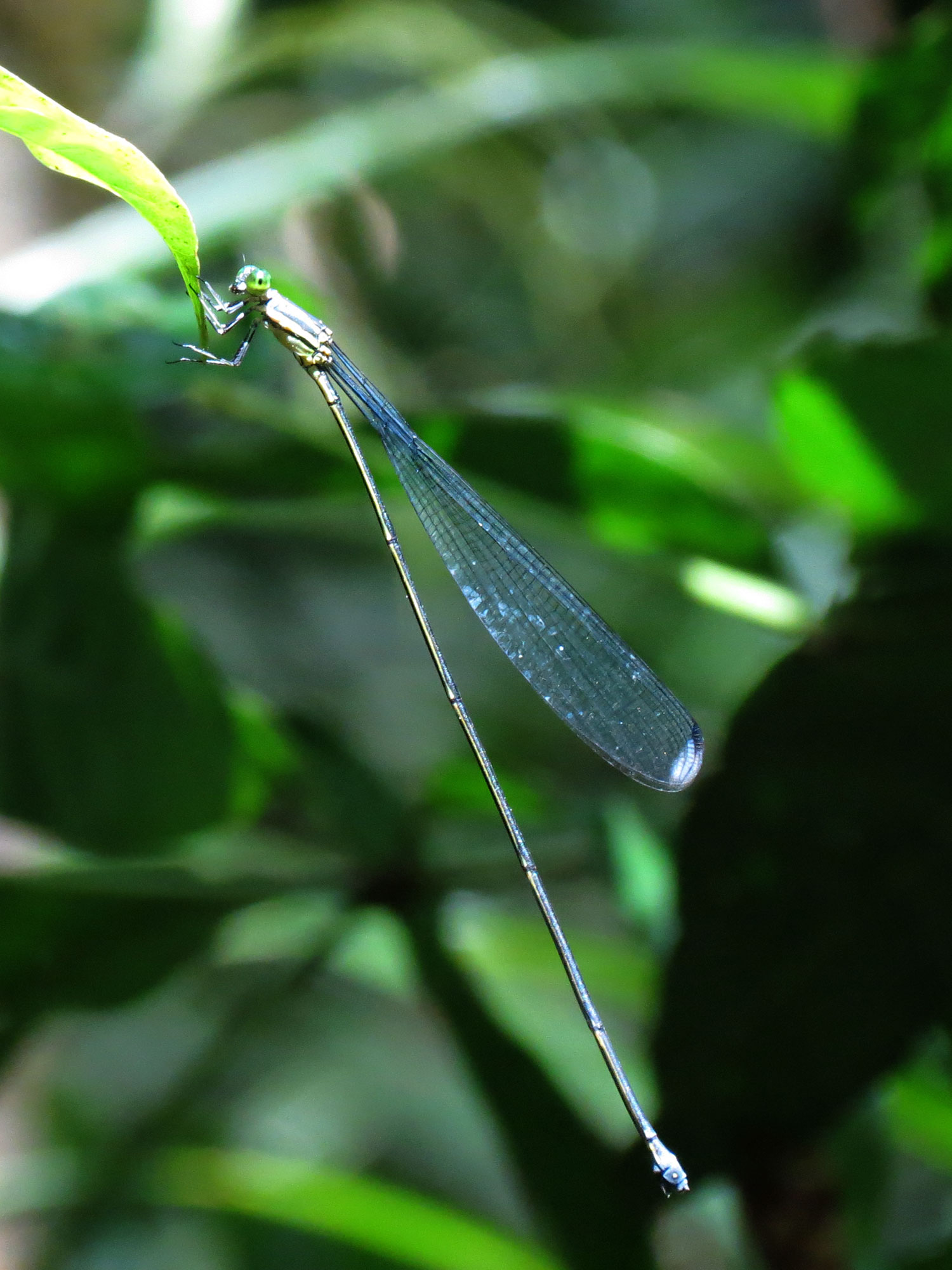

Scientific classification
- Kingdom: Animalia
- Phylum: Arthropoda
- Clade: Pancrustacea
- Class: Insecta
- Order: Odonata
- Suborder: Zygoptera
- Family: Coenagrionidae
- Genus: Mecistogaster
- Species: M. linearis

Binomial name
- Mecistogaster linearis (Fabricius, 1777)

= Mecistogaster linearis =

Species of damselfly

Mecistogaster linearis is a species of narrow-winged damselfly in the family Coenagrionidae. It is found in South America. It is a predator of web-building spiders.

== Subspecies ==
These two subspecies belong to the species Mecistogaster linearis:

- Mecistogaster linearis infumata Fraser, 1946
- Mecistogaster linearis linearis (Fabricius, 1777)
