= Microstigma anomalum =

Scientific classification
- Kingdom: Animalia
- Phylum: Arthropoda
- Class: Insecta
- Order: Odonata
- Suborder: Zygoptera
- Family: Coenagrionidae
- Genus: Microstigma
- Species: M. anomalum

Binomial name
- Microstigma anomalum Rambur, 1842

Species of damselfly

Microstigma anomalum is a species of narrow-winged damselfly in the family Coenagrionidae. It is found in South America.
