= List of damselflies of the world (Megapodagrionidae) =

- Allopodagrion brachyurum
- Allopodagrion contortum
- Allopodagrion erinys
- Megapodagrion megalopus
- Teinopodagrion angulatum
- Teinopodagrion caquetanum
- Teinopodagrion chinichaysuyum
- Teionpodagrion croizati
- Teinopodagrion curtum
- Teinopodagrion decipiens
- Teinopodagrion depressum
- Teinopodagrion epidrium
- Teionpodagrion eretes
- Teinopodagrion lepidum
- Teniopodagrion macropus
- Teinopodagrion mercenarium
- Teinopodagrion meridionale
- Teinopodagrion muzanum
- Teinopodagrion nebulosum
- Teinopodagrion oscillans
- Teinopodagrion schiessi
- Teinopodagrion setigerum
- Teinopodagrion temporale
- Teinopodagrion turikum
- Teinopodagrion vallenatum
- Teinopodagrion venale
- Teinopodagrion vilorianum
- Teinopodagrion waynu
- Teinopodagrion yunka
