= Mecistogaster asticta =

Conservation status
- Vulnerable (IUCN 3.1)

Scientific classification
- Kingdom: Animalia
- Phylum: Arthropoda
- Class: Insecta
- Order: Odonata
- Suborder: Zygoptera
- Family: Coenagrionidae
- Genus: Mecistogaster
- Species: M. asticta

Binomial name
- Mecistogaster asticta Sélys, 1860

Synonyms
- Platystigma astictum

Species of damselfly

Mecistogaster asticta is a species of damselfly in the family Coenagrionidae which is endemic to Brazil. Its natural habitat is subtropical or tropical moist lowland forests, where it is threatened by deforestation.
