= Mecistogaster pronoti =

Conservation status
- Critically Endangered (IUCN 3.1)

Scientific classification
- Kingdom: Animalia
- Phylum: Arthropoda
- Class: Insecta
- Order: Odonata
- Suborder: Zygoptera
- Family: Coenagrionidae
- Genus: Mecistogaster
- Species: M. pronoti

Binomial name
- Mecistogaster pronoti Sjöstedt, 1918

Species of damselfly

Mecistogaster pronoti is a species of damselfly in the family Coenagrionidae. It is endemic to Brazil. Its natural habitat is subtropical or tropical moist lowland forests. It is considered as critically endangered and is threatened by habitat loss.
