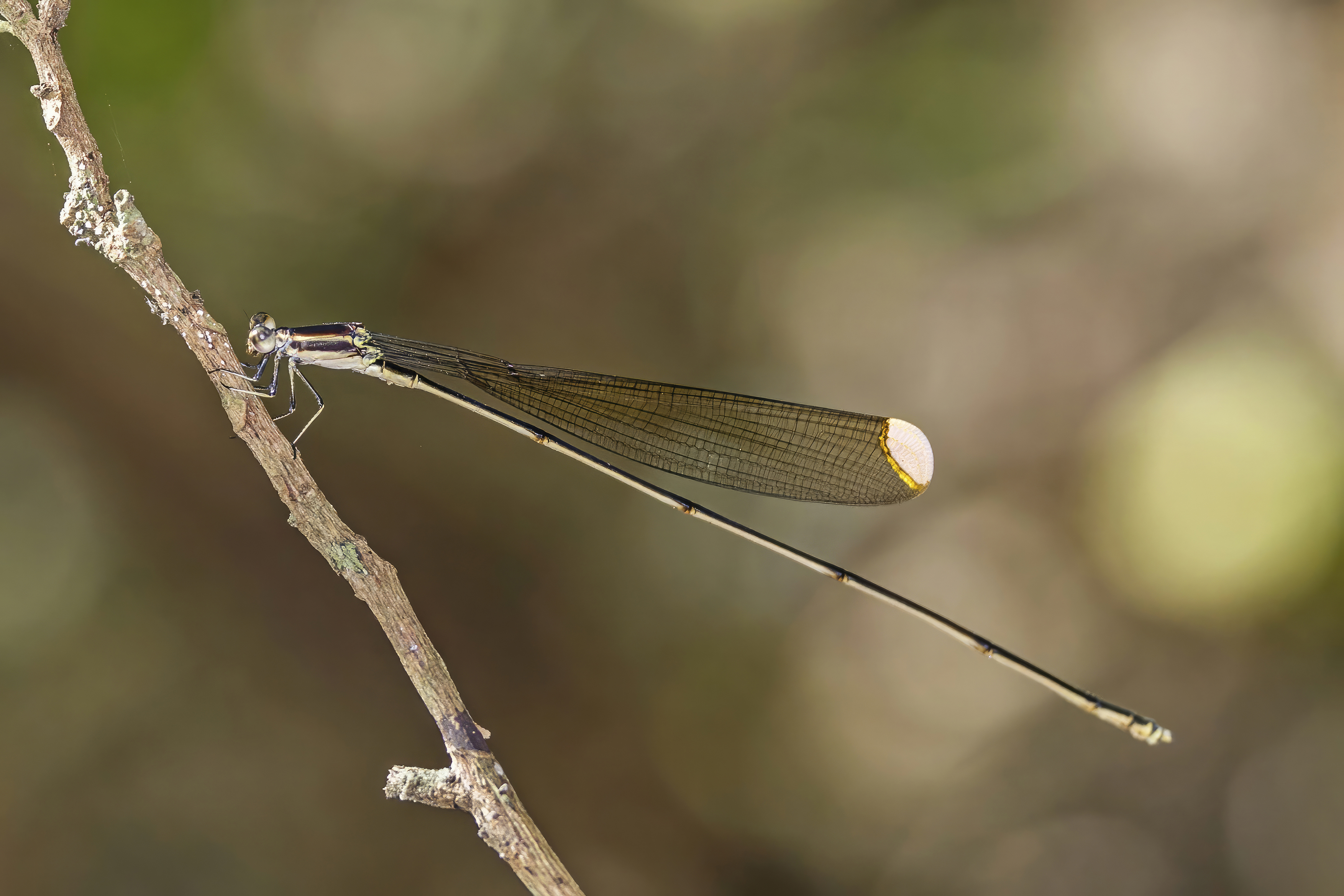
- Female, Honduras

Conservation status
- Least Concern (IUCN 3.1)

Scientific classification
- Kingdom: Animalia
- Phylum: Arthropoda
- Class: Insecta
- Order: Odonata
- Suborder: Zygoptera
- Family: Coenagrionidae
- Genus: Mecistogaster
- Species: M. ornata

Binomial name
- Mecistogaster ornata Rambur, 1842

= Mecistogaster ornata =

Species of damselfly

Mecistogaster ornata, the lemon-tipped helicopter, or ornate helicopter, is a species of narrow-winged damselfly in the family Coenagrionidae. It is found in Central America and South America.

The IUCN conservation status of Mecistogaster ornata is "LC", least concern, with no immediate threat to the species' survival. The IUCN status was reviewed in 2009.

== Subspecies ==
These two subspecies belong to the species Mecistogaster ornata:

- Mecistogaster ornata acutipennis Selys, 1886
- Mecistogaster ornata ornata Rambur, 1842
