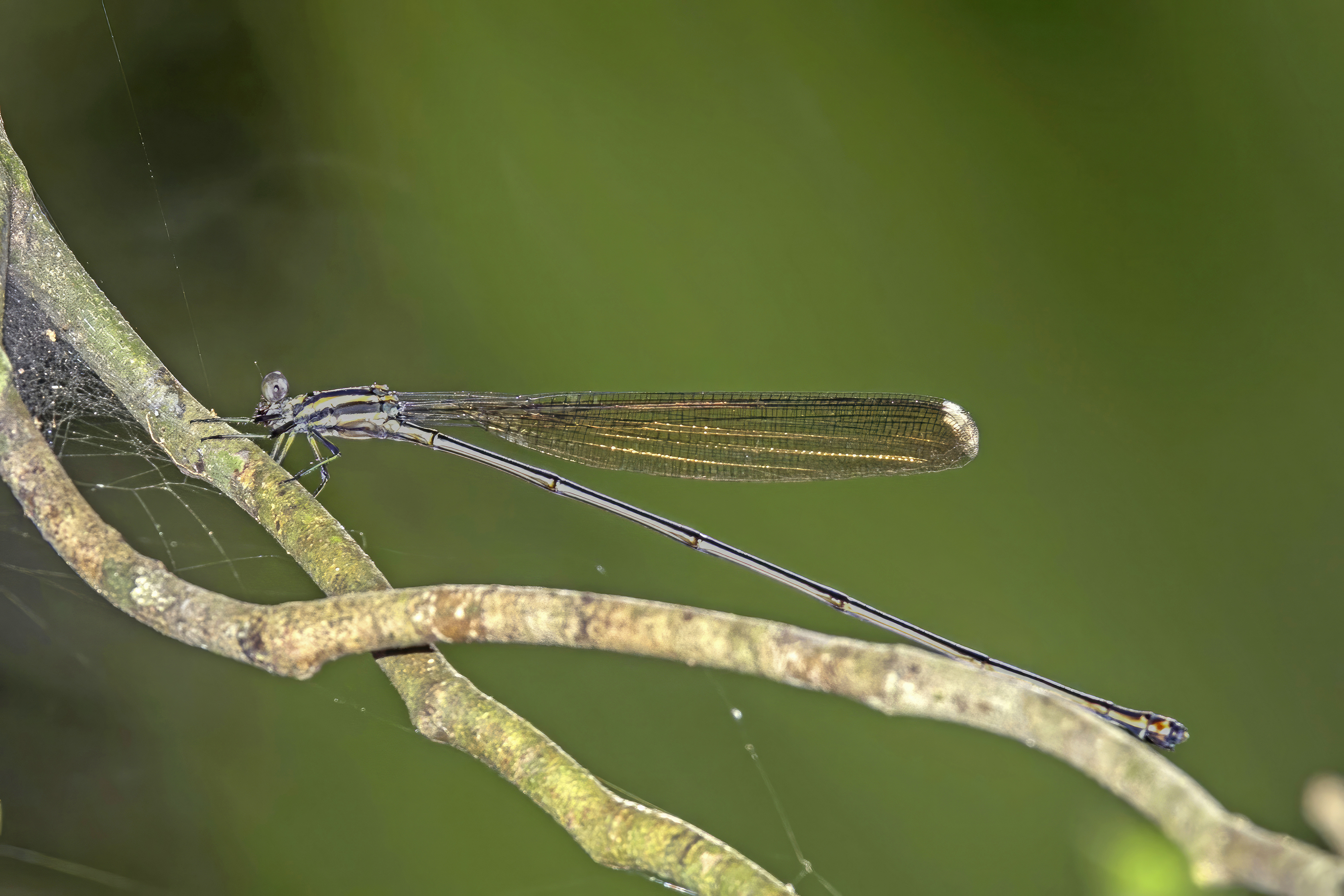
- Female, Belize

Scientific classification
- Domain: Eukaryota
- Kingdom: Animalia
- Phylum: Arthropoda
- Class: Insecta
- Order: Odonata
- Suborder: Zygoptera
- Family: Coenagrionidae
- Genus: Mecistogaster
- Species: M. modesta

Binomial name
- Mecistogaster modesta Selys, 1860

= Mecistogaster modesta =

Species of damselfly

Mecistogaster modesta is a species of narrow-winged damselfly in the family Coenagrionidae. It is found in Central America.

== Subspecies ==
These two subspecies belong to the species Mecistogaster modesta:

- Mecistogaster modesta iphigenia Selys, 1886
- Mecistogaster modesta modesta Selys, 1860
