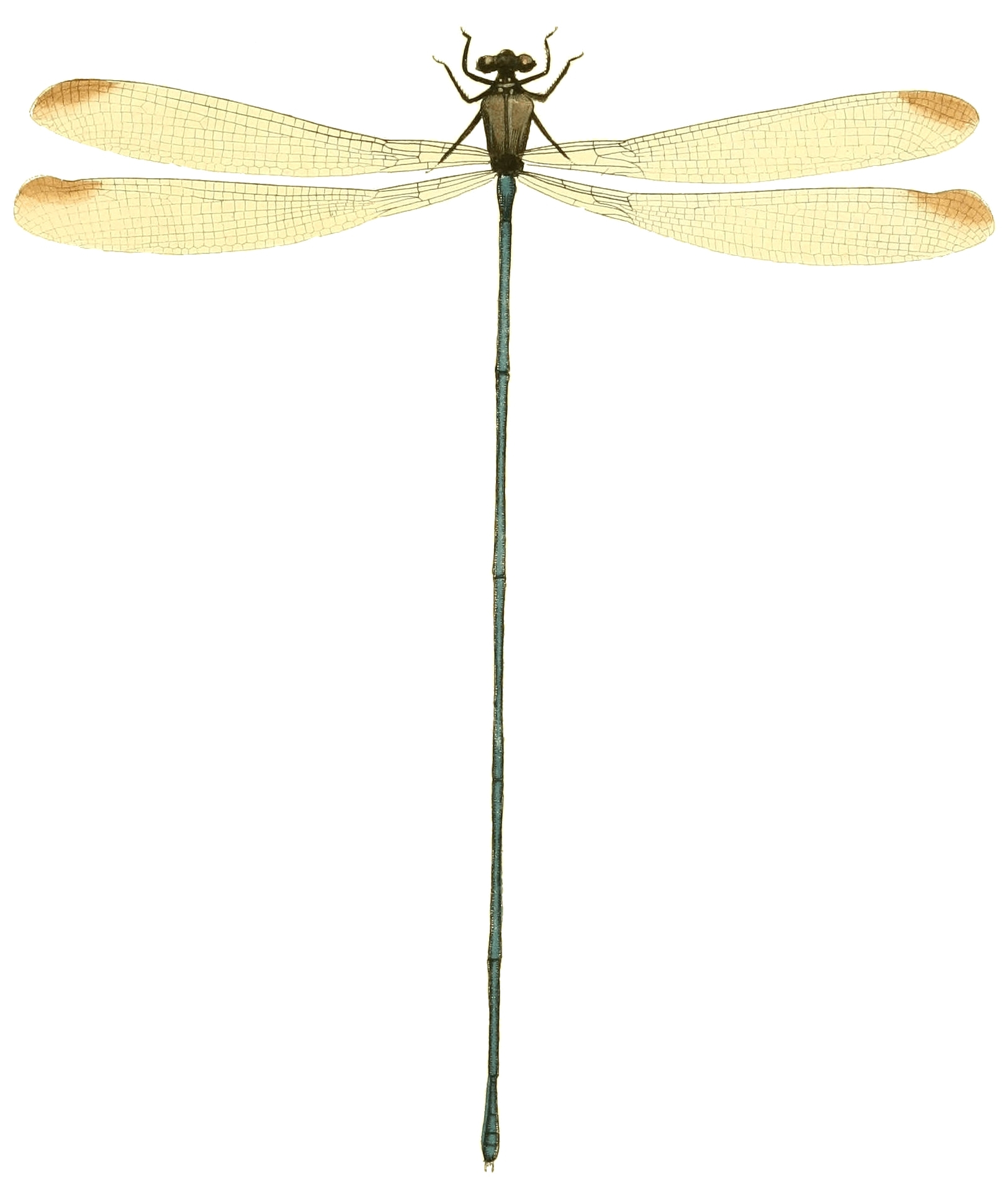

Conservation status
- Least Concern (IUCN 3.1)

Scientific classification
- Kingdom: Animalia
- Phylum: Arthropoda
- Class: Insecta
- Order: Odonata
- Suborder: Zygoptera
- Family: Coenagrionidae
- Genus: Mecistogaster
- Species: M. lucretia

Binomial name
- Mecistogaster lucretia (Drury, 1773)

= Mecistogaster lucretia =

Species of damselfly

Mecistogaster lucretia is a species of narrow-winged damselfly in the family Coenagrionidae. It is found in South America.

== Subspecies ==
These two subspecies belong to the species Mecistogaster lucretia:

- Mecistogaster lucretia hauxwelli Selys, 1886
- Mecistogaster lucretia lucretia (Drury, 1773)
