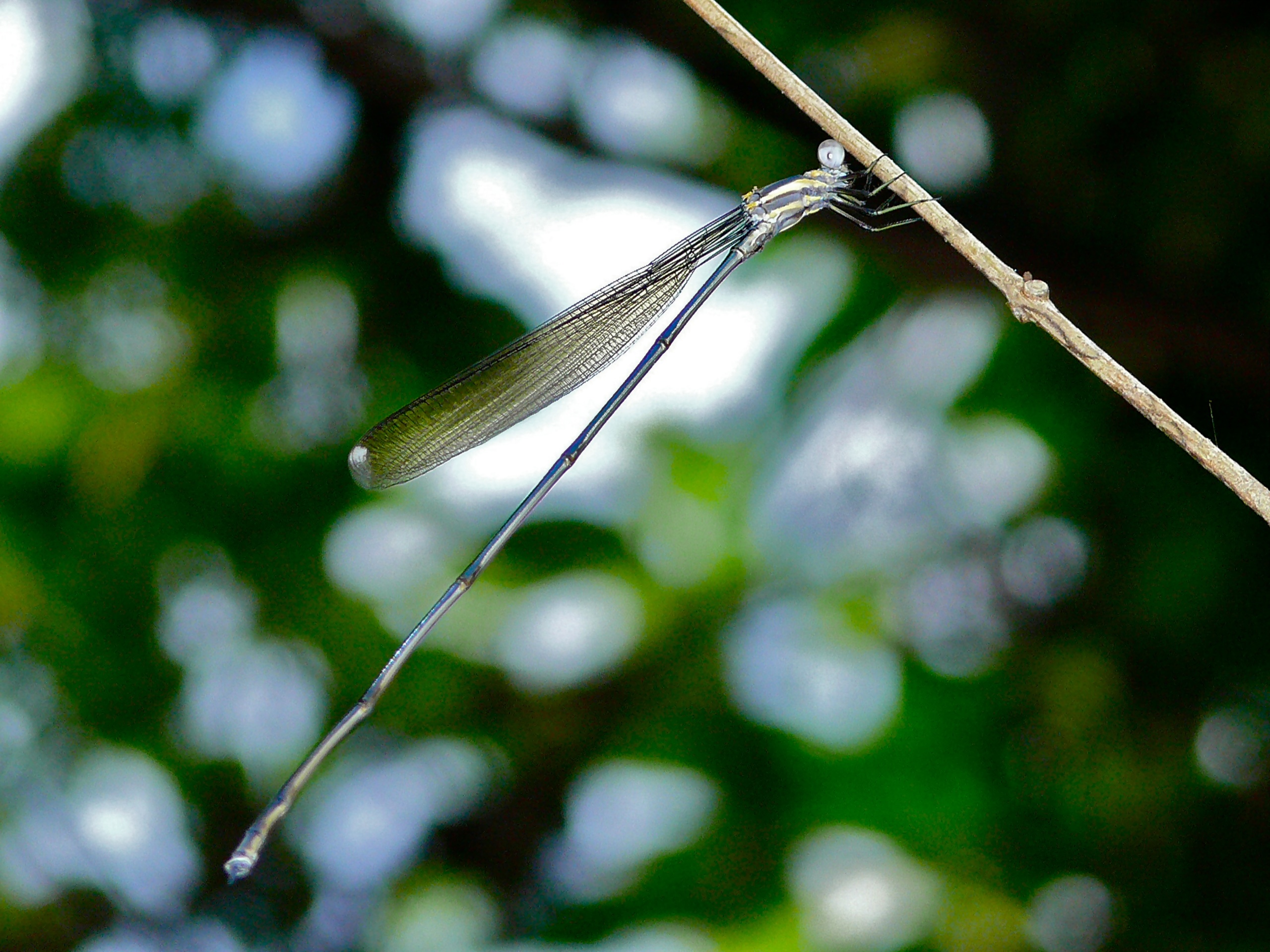
- Mecistogaster modesta

Scientific classification
- Kingdom: Animalia
- Phylum: Arthropoda
- Class: Insecta
- Order: Odonata
- Suborder: Zygoptera
- Family: Coenagrionidae
- Genus: Mecistogaster; Rambur, 1842

= Mecistogaster =

Genus of damselflies

Mecistogaster is a genus of large Neotropical damselflies in the family Coenagrionidae, commonly known as helicopter damsels. There are eleven species distributed from Mexico to Argentina.

Members of this genus have very long abdomens which they use to deposit their eggs in the water-filled rosettes of bromeliads growing on trees in the forest.

Species include:

- Mecistogaster amalia (Burmeister, 1839) – Amalia Helicopter
- Mecistogaster amazonica Sjöstedt, 1918
- Mecistogaster asticta Selys, 1860
- Mecistogaster buckleyi McLachlan, 1881 – Blue-tipped Helicopter
- Mecistogaster jocaste Hagen, 1869
- Mecistogaster linearis (Fabricius, 1776)
- Mecistogaster lucretia (Drury, 1773)
- Mecistogaster martinezi Machado, 1985 (nomen obscurum)
- Mecistogaster modesta Selys, 1860
- Mecistogaster ornata Rambur, 1842 – Ornate Helicopter
- Mecistogaster pronoti Sjöstedt, 1918 – Atlantic Helicopter
