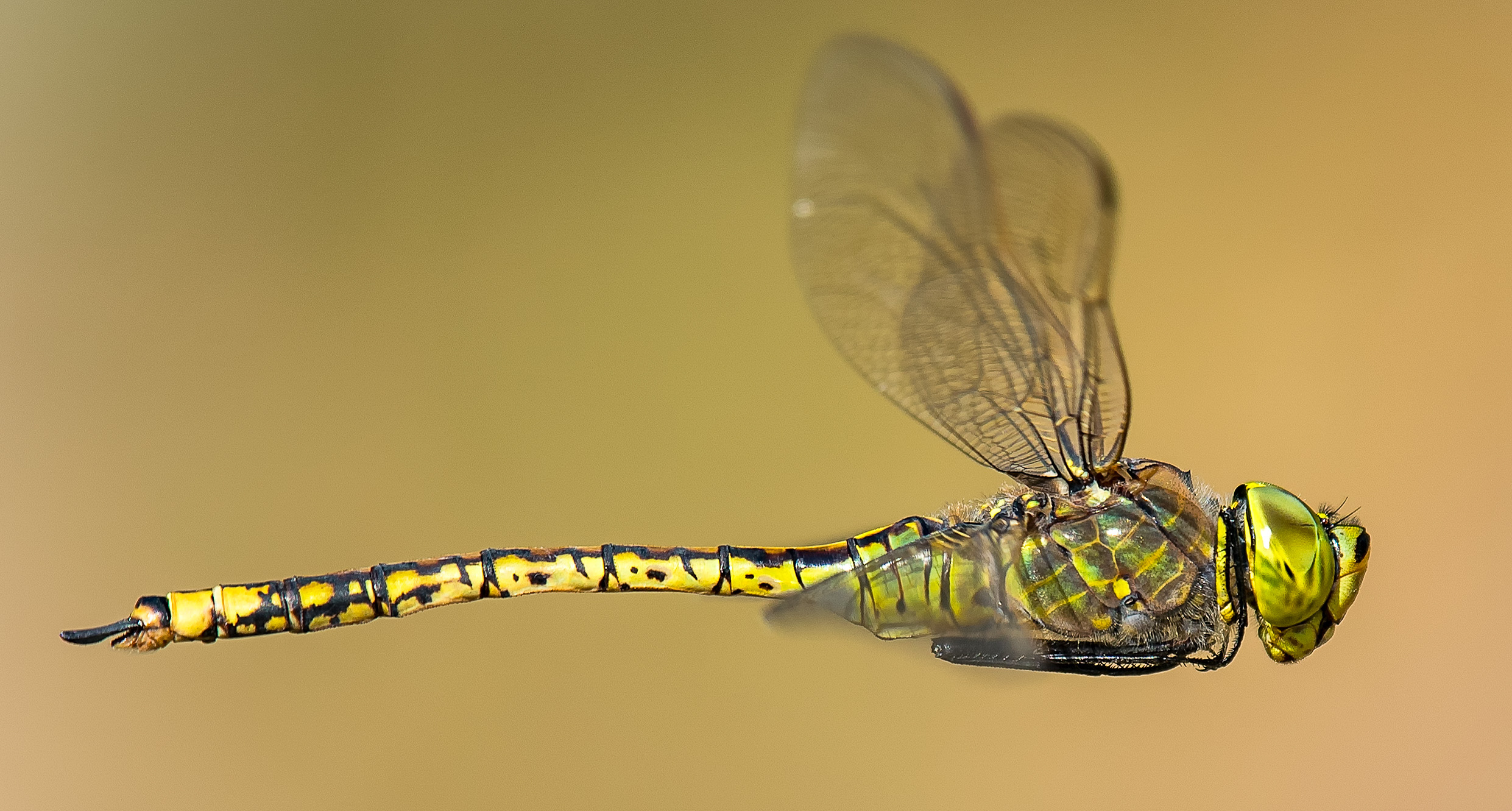
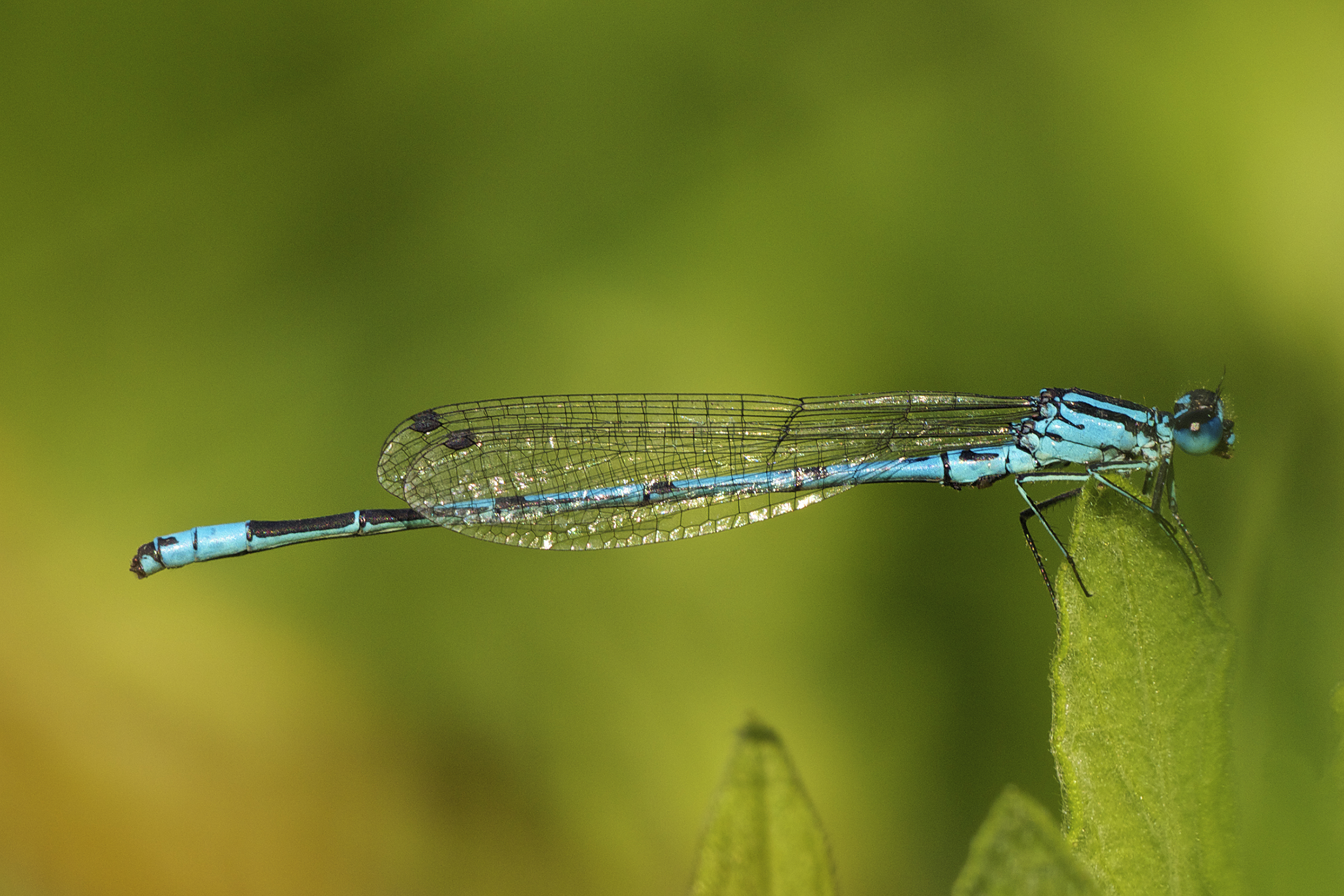
- An anisopteran, Anax papuensis An anisozygopteran, Epiophlebia superstes A zygopteran, Coenagrion puella

Scientific classification
- Kingdom: Animalia
- Phylum: Arthropoda
- Clade: Pancrustacea
- Class: Insecta
- Clade: Dicondylia
- Subclass: Pterygota
- Infraclass: Palaeoptera
- Superorder: Odonatoptera
- Order: Odonata; Fabricius, 1793

Suborders
- Zygoptera (damselflies); Epiprocta; Anisozygoptera/Epiophlebioptera (damsel-dragonflies); Anisoptera (dragonflies); For extinct groups and discussion, see text
- Distribution of Odonata

= Odonata =

Odonata Temporal range: Late Triassic–Recent

Order of insects that includes the dragonflies and damselflies

Odonata is an order of predatory flying insects that includes dragonflies (Anisoptera), damselflies (Zygoptera), as well as the three relict species of damsel-dragonflies (Anisozygoptera), the latter two often grouped together. These groups are distinguished by the bulkier build, larger, usually contiguous, compound eyes, and, a typically horizontal resting position of wings of dragonflies, and by the slender body, smaller, laterally-placed eyes, and, a typically closed resting position of the wings of damselflies. Intermediate characters are found in damsel-dragonflies (Epiophlebia). Adult odonates can land and perch, but, contrary to myth, can also rarely walk.

Almost all odonates have aquatic nymphs called naiads, and all of them, juveniles and adults, are carnivorous, the latter almost entirely insectivorous, though nymphs will eat anything that they can overpower, including small fish. The adults are superb aerial hunters and their legs are specialised for catching prey in flight.

Odonata in its narrow sense forms a subgroup of the broader Odonatoptera, which includes other dragonfly-like insects. The scientific study of the Odonata is called odonatology.

== Etymology and terminology ==
Johan Christian Fabricius coined the term Odonata in 1793 from the Ancient Greek ὀδών odṓn (Ionic form of ὀδούς odoús) "tooth". One hypothesis is that it was because their maxillae are notably toothed.

The word dragonfly usually denotes only Anisoptera, but is sometimes used to mean all Odonata. Odonata enthusiasts avoid ambiguity by using the term true dragonfly, or simply anisopteran, when they mean just the Anisoptera. An alternative term warriorfly has been proposed.

== Morphology ==
=== External morphology ===
==== Size ====
The largest living odonate by wingspan is Megaloprepus coerulatus (Zygoptera: Pseudostigmatidae) with a wing span of 19.1 cm (7.5 in), while the extinct Triadotypus guillaumei reached 28.0 cm (11.0 in). The heaviest living odonate is Tetracanthagyna plagiata. The longest extant odonate is the Neotropical helicopter damselfly Mecistogaster linearis (Zygoptera: Pseudostigmatidae) with a body length of 135 mm (5.3 in).

The smallest living dragonfly is Nannophya pygmaea (Anisoptera: Libellulidae) from east Asia, with a body length of 15 mm (0.59 in) and a wing span of 20 mm (0.79 in). The smallest damselflies (and also the smallest odonates) are species of the genus Agriocnemis (Zygoptera: Coenagrionidae) with a wing span of only 17–18 mm (0.67–0.71 in).

==== Description ====
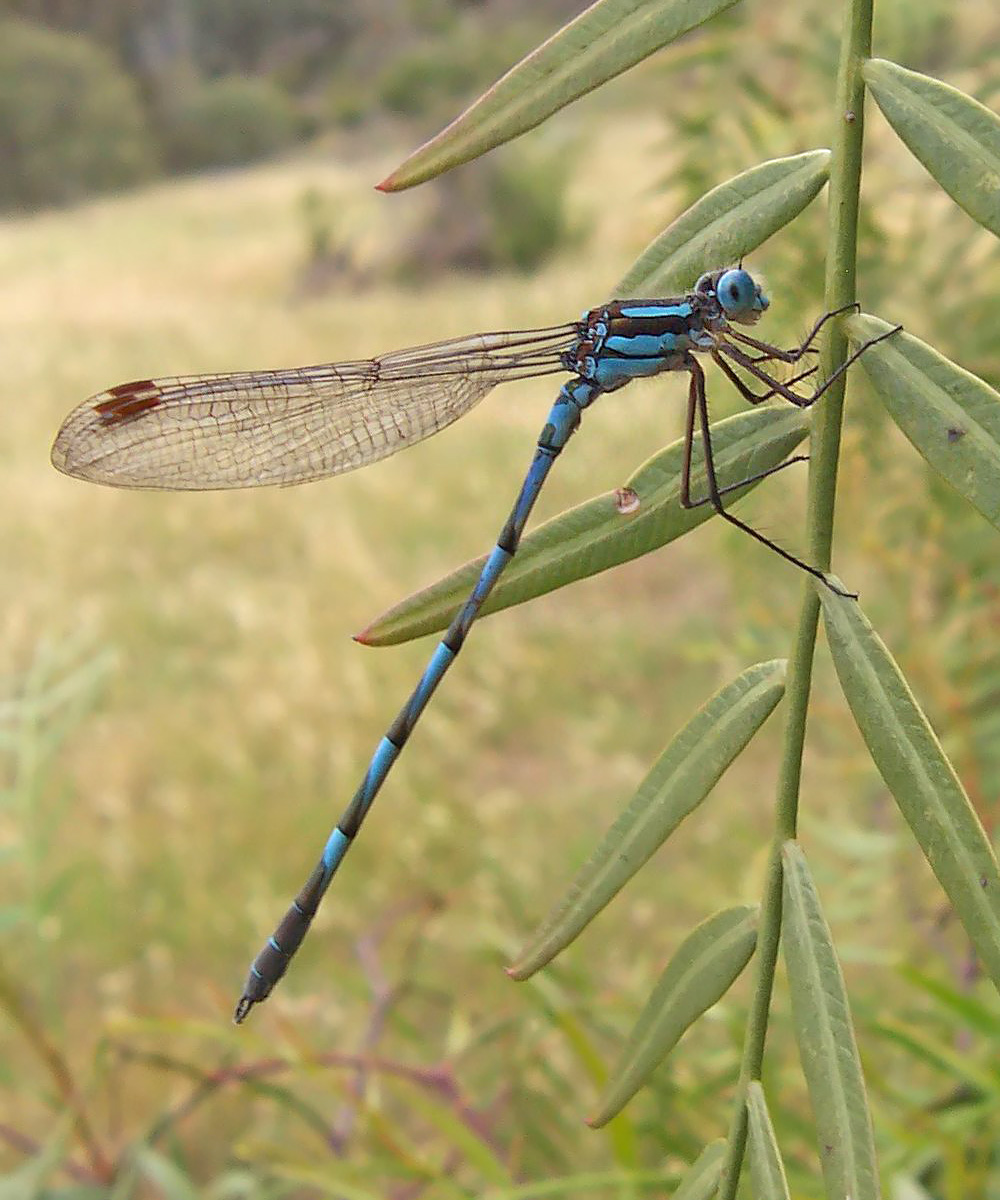
Male blue ringtail (Austrolestes annulosus), a damselfly (Zygoptera: Lestidae)

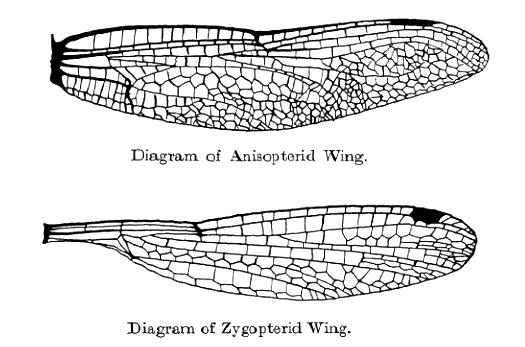
Dragonfly (top) and damselfly (bottom) wing shape and venation

These insects characteristically have large rounded heads covered mostly by well-developed, compound eyes, which provide good vision, legs that facilitate catching prey (other insects) in flight, two pairs of long, transparent wings that move independently, and elongated abdomens. They have three ocelli and short antennae. The mouthparts are on the underside of the head and include simple chewing mandibles in the adult.

Flight in the Odonata is direct, with flight muscles attaching directly to the wings; rather than indirect, with flight muscles attaching to the thorax, as is found in the Neoptera. This allows active control of the amplitude, frequency, angle of attack, camber and twist of each of the four wings entirely independently.

There is a structure on the leading edge near the tip of the wing of most odonates called the pterostigma. This is a thickened, hemolymph–filled and often colorful area bounded by veins. The pterostigma, a heavier section of the wing than nearby sections, assists in gliding. Without the pterostigmata, self-exciting vibrations known as flutter would set in on the wing above a certain critical speed, making gliding impossible. The pterostigma is also found in some other insects. It is absent in very few groups, such as Pseudostigmatidae, and some Hetaerina and Mnesarete

Odonates without pterostigmata

Calopteryx amata

Mnesarete pruinosa

Neurobasis kaupi

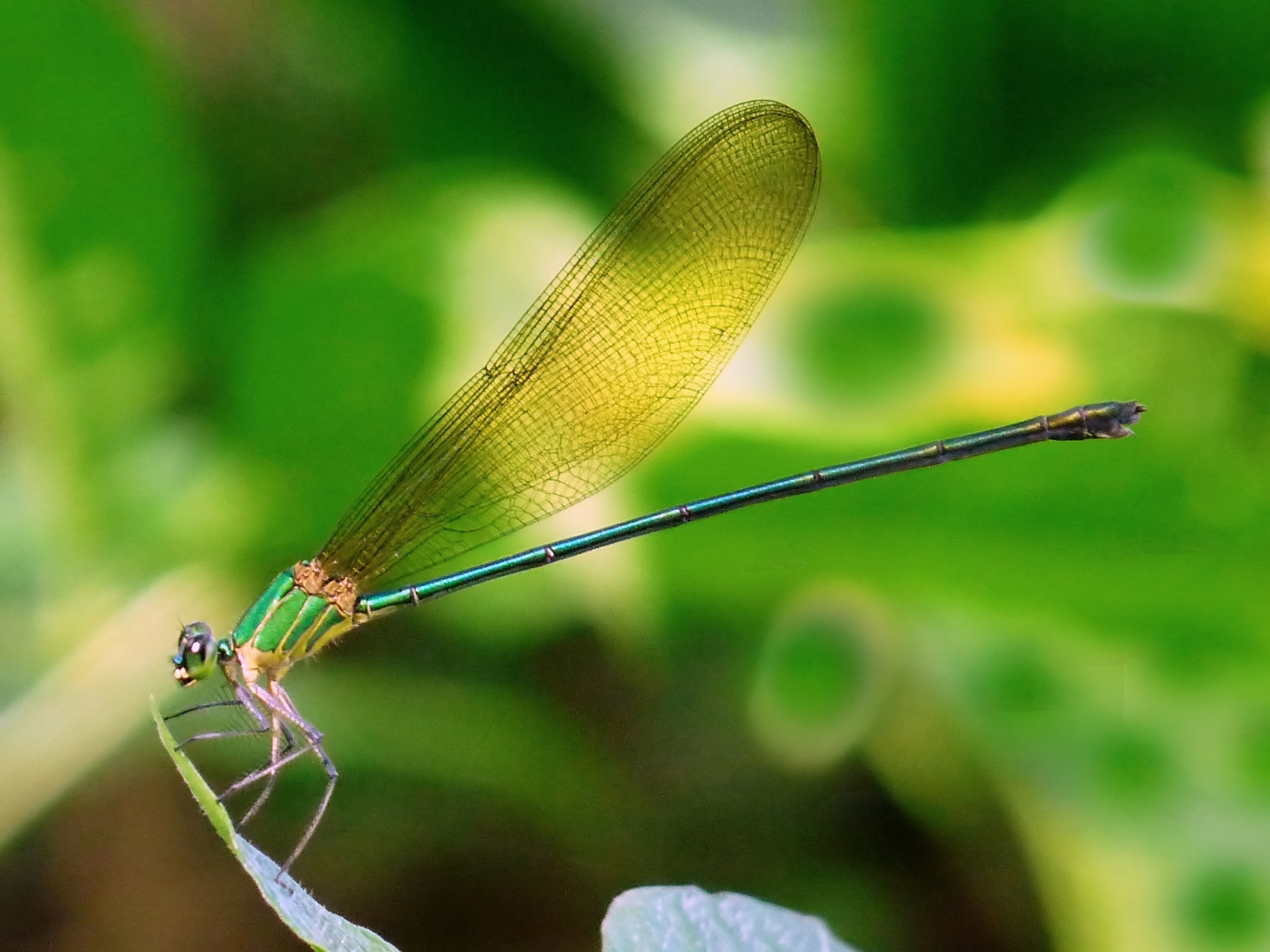
Vestalis gracilis

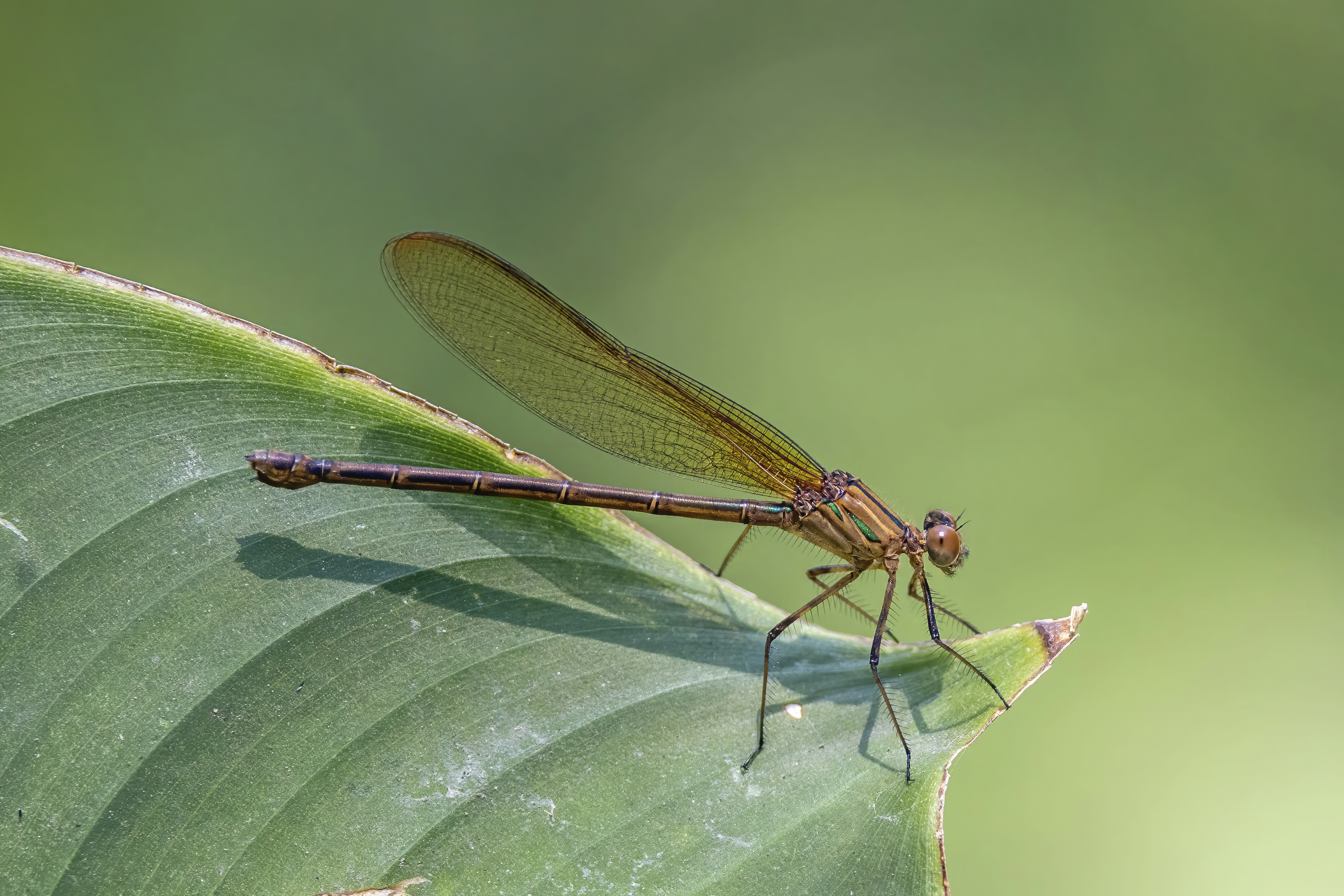
Hetaerina cruentata

===== Nymphs =====
The nymphs have stockier, shorter, bodies than the adults. In addition to lacking functional wings (only present as wing pads in later instars), their eyes are smaller, their antennae longer, and their heads are less mobile than in the adult. They have biting-chewing mouthparts, with a modified prehensile labium called a "labial mask", which is used for grasping prey. This adaptation is comparable to the telescopic labium of Steninae and the mandible-like labella (a modified apical part of the labium in dipteran flies) of some Dolichopodidae. The nymphal respiratory structures varies dramatically:

- in damselfly nymphs they are external gills on the posterior end of the abdomen, taking on a filiform and setose appearance in early nymphs, then becoming triangular in cross-section, and, in most cases, later swollen or flattened. Only in the families Euphaeidae (=Epallagidae) and Polythoridae, there are also paired ventrolateral gill-like structures on the abdominal segments 2–7 or 2–8, which have been studied ontogenetically and appear to be homologous to abdominal appendages, with independent musculature, innervation and segmentation.
- in dragonfly and Epiophlebia nymphs, they are represented by the "branchial basket", an organ located in the hindgut/rectum composed of six longitudinal rows of rectal gills, with syncitial elements and a complex tracheal system. While in Epiophlebia jet propulsion has not been observed, it is a common behavior used by anisopteran naiads, as an escape method and to counteract the recoil created by the labial mask, similar to their active ventilation, which is manipulated by the complex anal valves to create thrust vectoring.

== Evolution ==
=== Fossil history ===
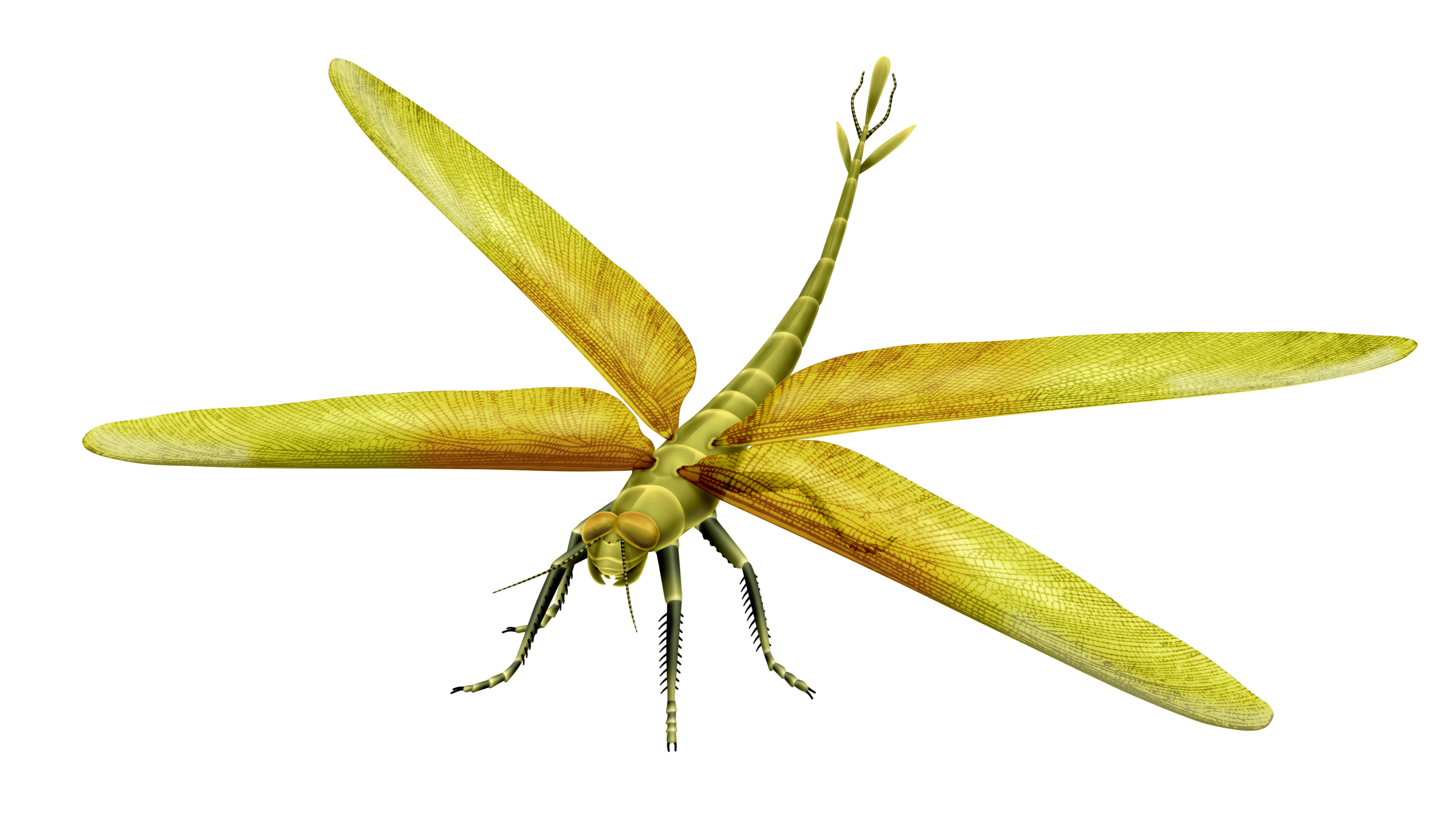
The giant Upper Carboniferous dragonfly ancestor, Meganeura monyi, had a wingspan of about 680 mm (27 in),

Members of the crown group Odonata first appeared during the Late Triassic, though members of their total group, Odonatoptera, first appeared in the Late Carboniferous, making them one of the earliest groups of winged insects. The fossils of odonates and their cousins, including Paleozoic "giant dragonflies" like Meganeuropsis permiana from the Permian of North America, reached wing spans of up to 71 cm (28 in) and a body length of 43 cm (17 in), making it the largest insect of all time. This insect belonged to the extinct order Meganisoptera, the griffenflies, related to odonates but not part of the modern order Odonata in the restricted sense. They have one of the most complete fossil records going back 319 million years.

The Odonata is closely related to mayflies and several extinct orders in a group called the Palaeoptera, but this grouping might be paraphyletic. What they do share with mayflies is the nature of how the wings are articulated and held in rest.

Tarsophlebiidae is a prehistoric family of Odonatoptera that can be considered either a basal lineage of Odonata or their immediate sister taxon.

=== Phylogeny ===
The relationships among the three living suborders of Odonata according to Bybee et al. (2021):

- Odonata
  - - Zygoptera (damselflies)
    - - - - Anisozygoptera
          - Anisoptera (dragonflies)

=== Taxonomy ===
In some treatments, the Odonata are understood in an expanded sense (sensu lato), essentially synonymous with the superorder Odonatoptera, but not including the prehistoric Meganisoptera. In this approach, instead of Odonatoptera, the term Odonatoidea is used. The systematics of the "Palaeoptera" are by no means resolved; what can be said however is that regardless of whether they are called "Odonatoidea" or "Odonatoptera", the Odonata and their extinct relatives do form a clade.

Odonata sensu stricto has two major disputing classifications: the three-suborder classification, which recognizes Zygoptera, Anisoptera and Anisozygoptera as suborders, the latter represented by a group, that is paraphyletic in relation to Anisoptera, including the extant Epiophlebia and various extinct groups and the two-suborder classification, which regards Anisoptera and Epiophlebioptera, containing exclusively Epiophlebia, as infraorders within suborder Epiprocta. Epiprocta was proposed because the fossil taxa traditionally placed in Anisozygoptera formed a paraphyletic assemblage. In this treatment, those fossil taxa are distributed among several lineages of Odonatoptera or Odonata sensu lato.

Cladogram of Epiprocta after Rehn et al. 2003:

- Odonata
  - Zygoptera (damselflies)
  - Epiprocta
    - Epiophlebioptera
    - - †Isophlebioptera
      - - †Heterophlebioptera
        - - †Stenophlebioptera
          - - †Aeschnidioptera
            - Anisoptera (dragonflies)

Cladogram of Odonatoptera including Odonata by Deregnaucourt et al. 2023.

- Odonatoptera (Odonata sensu lato)
  - †Meganisoptera
    †Meganeuridae
  - Nodialata
    - †Protanisoptera
      - †Polytaxineuridae
      - - †Permaeschnidae
        - - †Callimokaltaniidae
          - - †Hemizygopteridae
            - †Ditaxineuridae
    - Discoidalia
      - †Triadophlebiomorpha
        - †Iverya
        - - †Pirouteliidae
          - - †Kargalotypidae
            - †Zygophlebiida
              - †Zygophlebiidae
              - †Moltenophlebiidae
              - - †Permophlebiidae
                - †Xamenophlebiidae
            - †Triadophlebiida
              - †Triassologus
              - †Sinotriadophlebiidae
              - †Mitophlebiidae
              - - †Paurophlebiidae
                - †Triadophlebiidae
      - Stigmoptera
        - †Permagrionidae
        - - †Archizygoptera
            - †Bakteniidae
            - †Kennedyidae
            - †Oboraneuridae
            - †Kaltanoneuridae
            - †Lodeviidae
            - †Luiseiidae
            - †Permepallagidae
            - - †Voltzialestidae
              - †Terskejoptera
                - †Terskeja
                - - †Protomyrmeleontidae
                  - †Moltenagrionidae
          - Panodonata
            - †Triassolestidae (in part)
            - Lobodonata
              - †Mesophlebiidae
              - †Triassolestidae (in part)
              - - †Tarsophlebiidae
                - Odonata crown group
                  - Zygoptera (damselflies)
                  - Epiproctophora
                    - - †Euthemistidae
                      - †Selenothemistidae
                      - - †Archithemistidae
                        - - †Campterophlebiidae
                          - †Isophlebiidae
                      - - †Sphenophlebiidae
                        - - †Asiopteridae
                          - †Cyclothemistidae
                    - - †Erichschmidtiidae
                      - - †Liassostenophlebiidae
                        - - †Prostenophlebiidae
                          - †Stenophlebiidae
                      - - †Myopophlebiidae
                        - - †Heterophlebiidae
                          - - †Liassophlebiidae
                            - †Parastenophlebiidae
                      - - †Juragomphidae
                        - †Liassogomphidae
                        - - †Aeschnidiidae
                          - Anisoptera (modern dragonflies)

== Life cycle ==
Odonates are aquatic or semi-aquatic as juveniles. Adults are most often seen near bodies of water and are frequently described as aquatic, but the adults of many species range far from water. They are insectivorous throughout their lives, mostly feeding on smaller insects.

Male Odonata have complex genitalia, different from those found in other insects. These include grasping cerci at the tip of the abdomen for holding the female, and a secondary set of copulatory organs located between the second and third abdominal segment in which the spermatozoa are stored after being produced by the primary genitals— whose external opening is known as the genital pore, on the ninth abdominal segment. This process is called intra-male sperm translocation (ST). Because the male copulatory organ has evolved independently from that in other insects, it has been suggested the stem-group dragonflies had external sperm transfer. To mate, the male claspers grasps the female by the thorax (Zygoptera) or head (Anisoptera) while the female bends her abdomen so that her own genitalia can be grasped by the copulatory organ holding the sperm. This is known as the "wheel" position. In Anisoptera, males often mate while flying, lifting the females in the air, which typically last from a couple of seconds to a minute or two, whereas the males in Zygoptera mate while perched. They might even move to different spots during the mating process, which can make it last longer, anywhere between five and ten minutes. Male Odonata are very competitive when it comes to mating that in some species, the males use the cerci located at the tip of the abdomen to remove the sperm of a rival male's from the female and put in his own.

Eggs are laid in water or on vegetation near water or wet places, and hatch to produce pronymphs which live off the nutrients that were in the egg. They then develop into instars with approximately 9–14 molts that are (in most species) voracious predators on other aquatic organisms, including small fishes. The nymphs grow and molt, usually in dusk or dawn, into the flying teneral immature adults, whose color is not yet developed. These transform into reproductive adults.

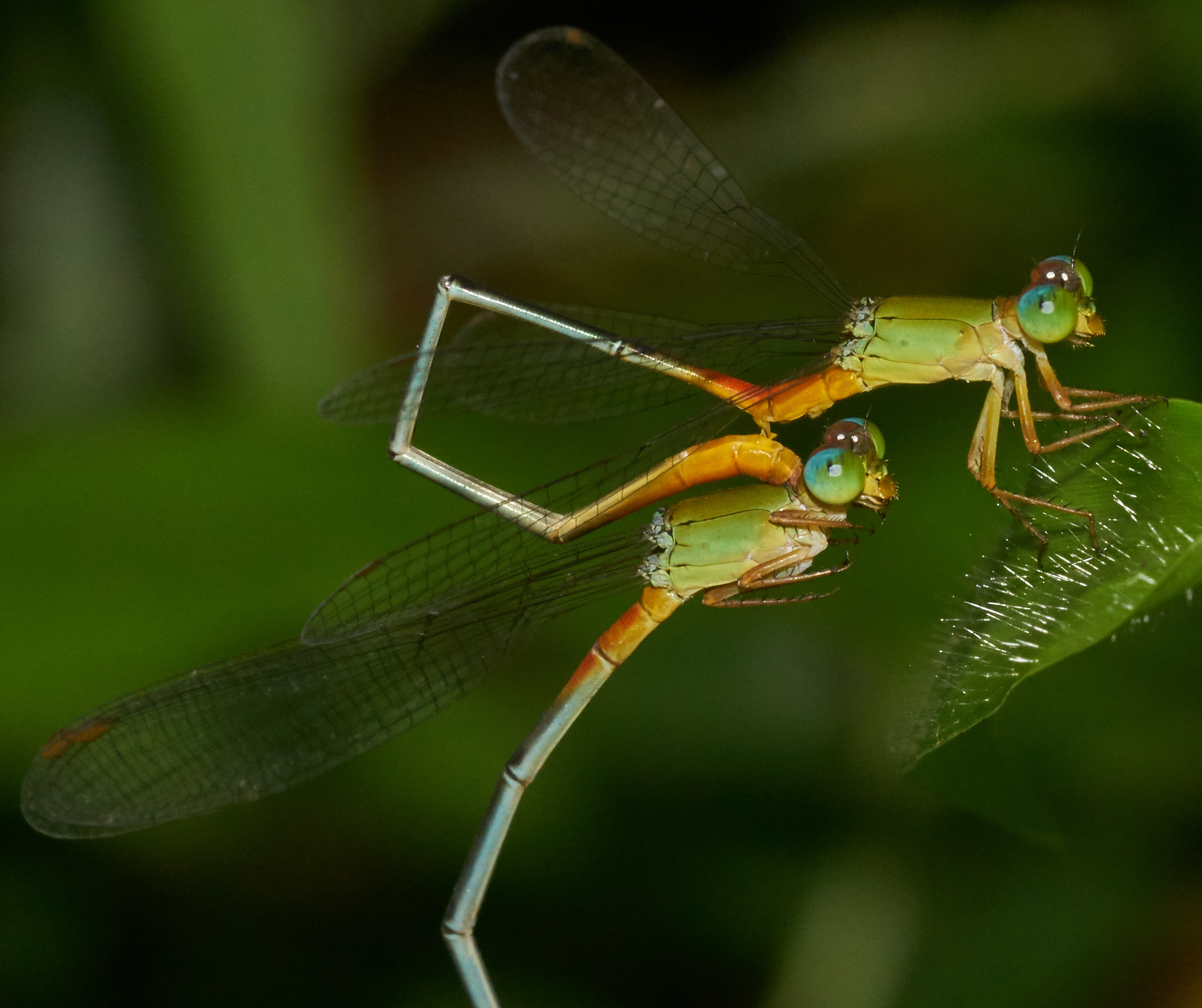
A pair of Ceriagrion cerinorubellum mating

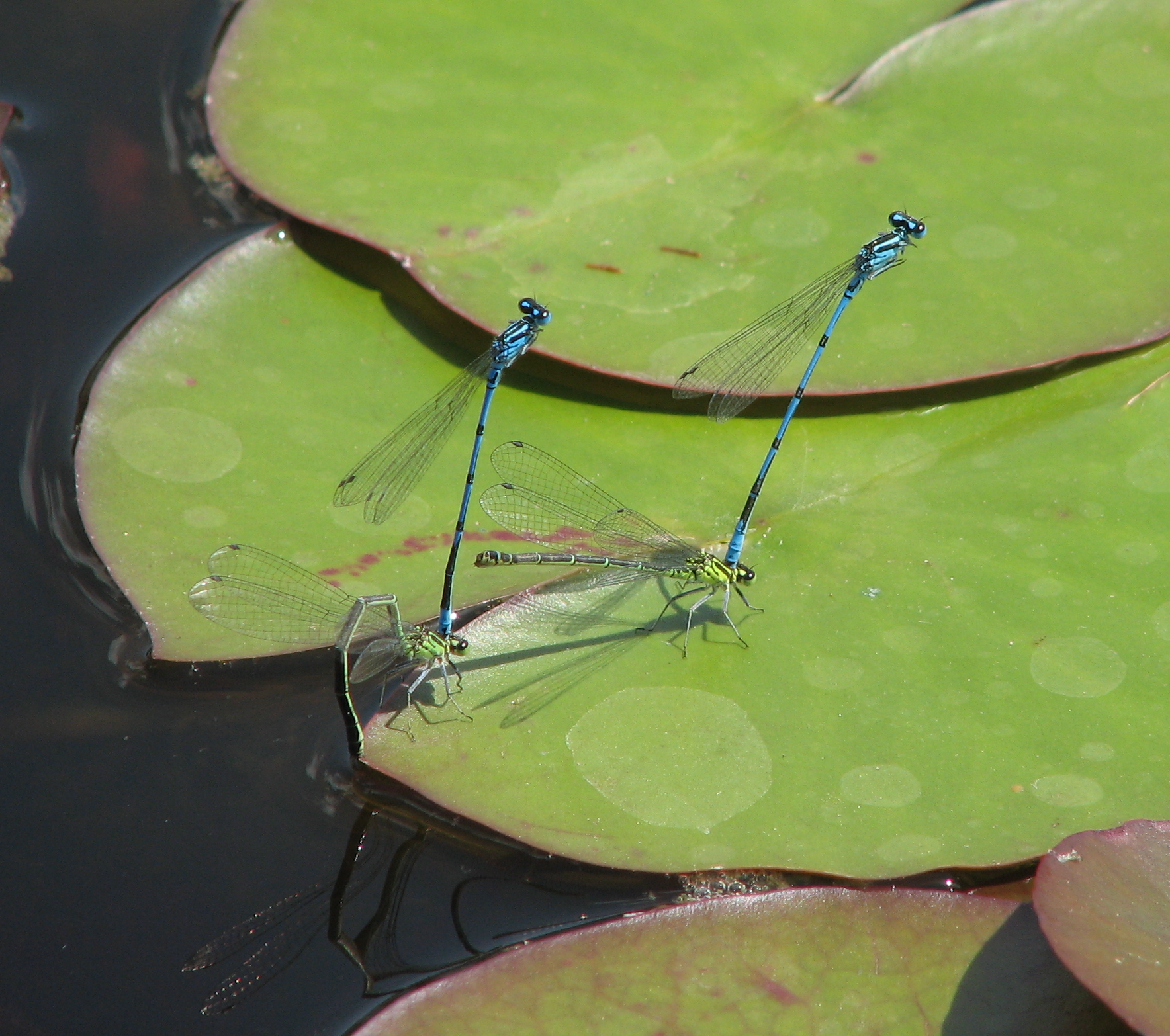
Ovipositing flight of two pairs of azure damselflies (Coenagrion puella)

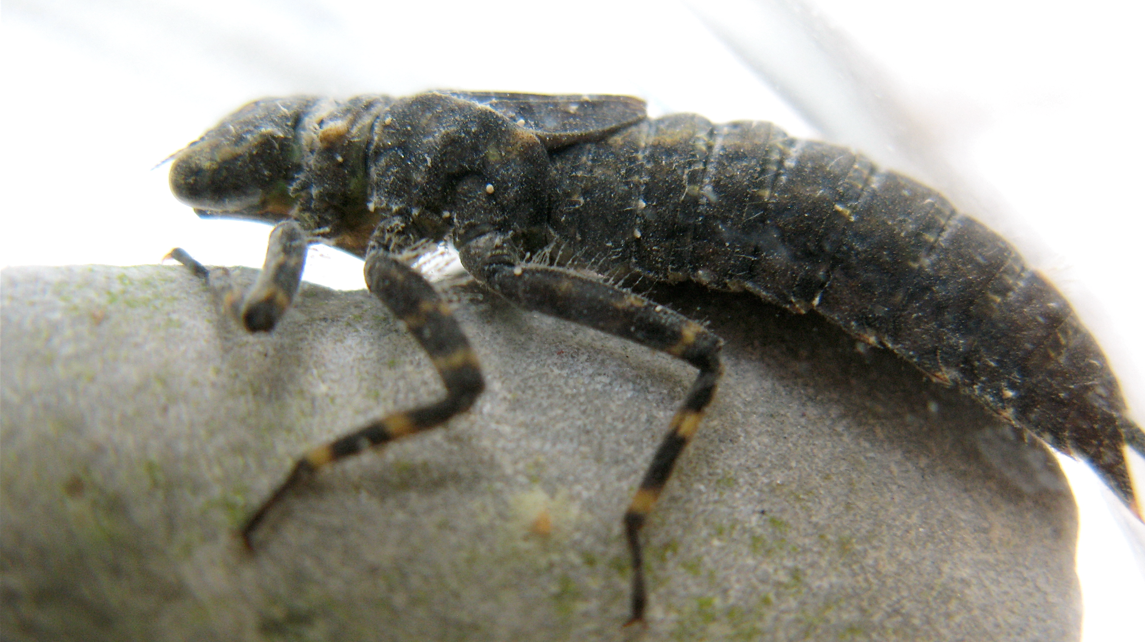
A nymph

== Ecology ==
Odonates can act as bioindicators of water quality in rivers because they rely on high quality water for proper development in early life. Since their diet consists entirely of insects, odonate density is directly proportional to the population of prey, and their abundance indicates the abundance of prey in the examined ecosystem. Species richness of vascular plants has also been positively correlated with the species richness of dragonflies in a given habitat. This means that in a location such as a lake, if one finds a wide variety of odonates, then a similarly wide variety of plants should also be present. This correlation is not common to all bioindicators, as some may act as indicators for a different environmental factor, such as the pool frog acting as a bioindicator of water quality due to its high quantity of time spent in and around water.

In addition, odonates are very sensitive to changes to average temperature. Many species have moved to higher elevations and latitudes as global temperature rises and habitats dry out. Changes to the life cycle have been recorded with increased development of the instar stages and smaller adult body size as the average temperature increases. As the territory of many species starts to overlap, the rate hybridization of species that normally do not come in contact is increasing. If global climate change continues many members of Odonata will start to disappear. Because odonates are such an old order and have such a complete fossil record they are an ideal species to study insect evolution and adaptation. For example, they are one of the first insects to develop flight and it is likely that this trait only evolved once in insects, looking at how flight works in odonates, the rest of flight can be mapped out.

Cannibalism has been recorded in many species of odonates, at both the larval and adult stages. Cannibalism is caused by either errors in species recognition, intrasexual competition for mating, or prevention of mating harassment.

Cannibalism in odonates

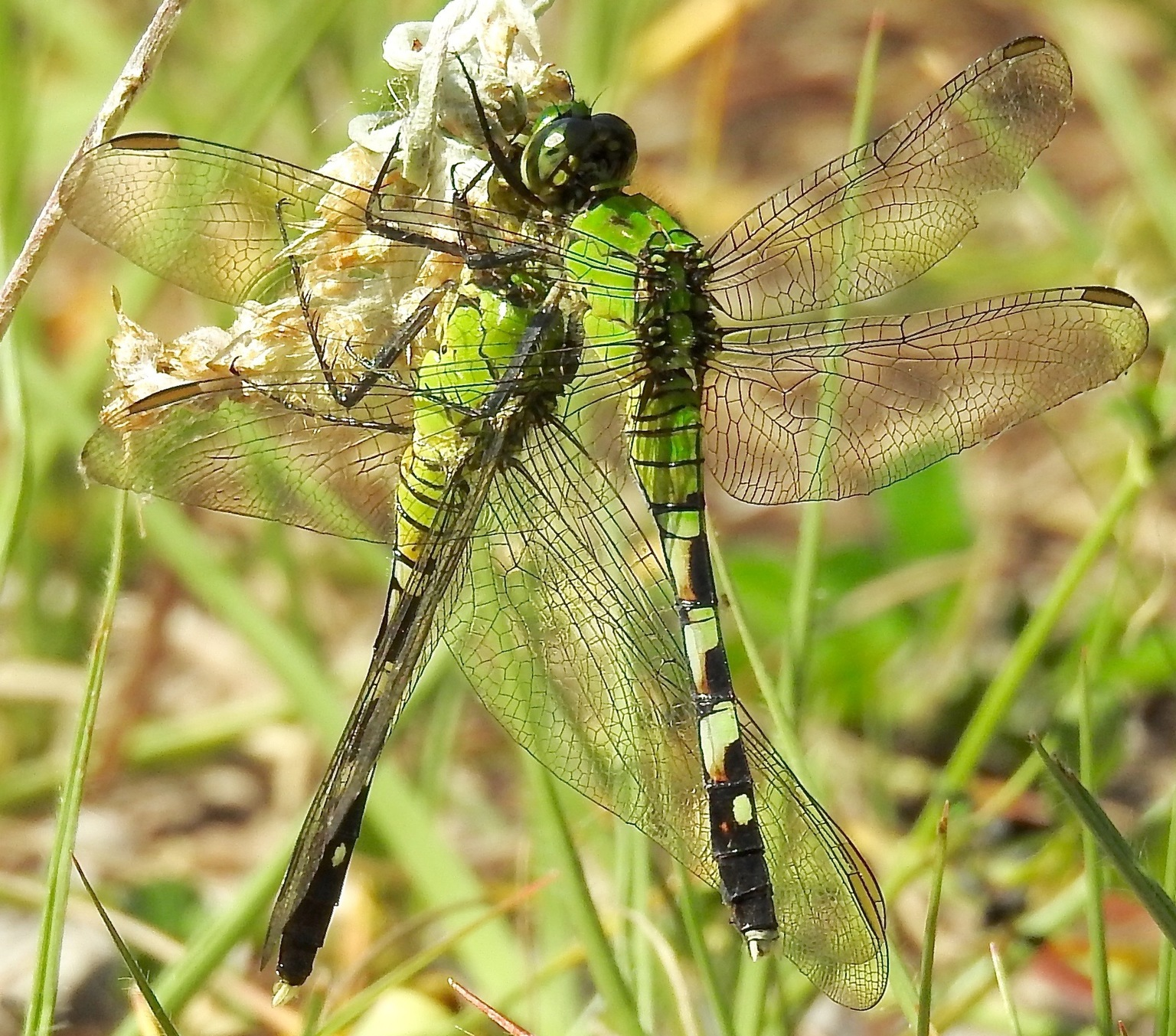
Female eastern pondhawk eating a young male

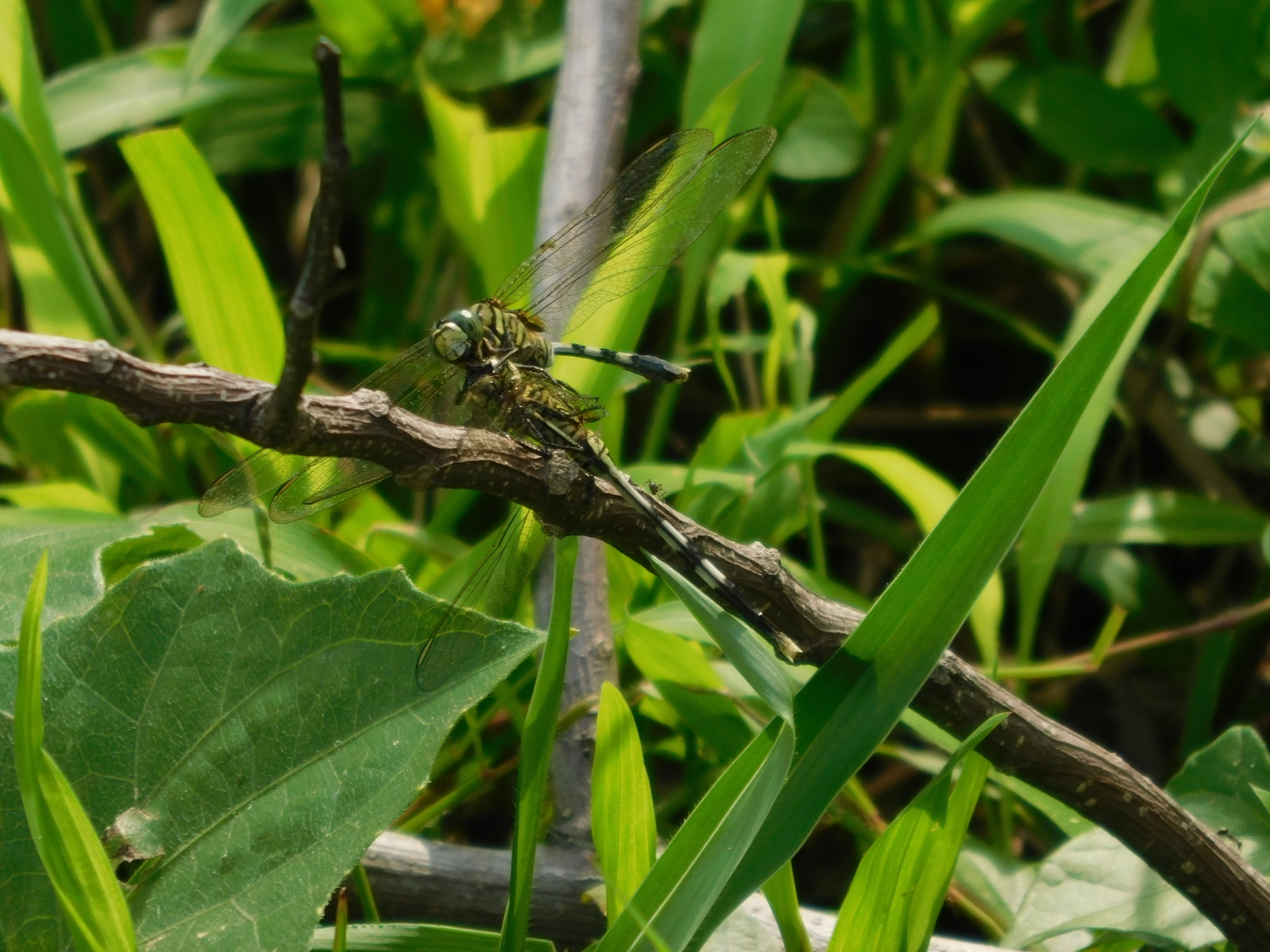
Slender skimmer

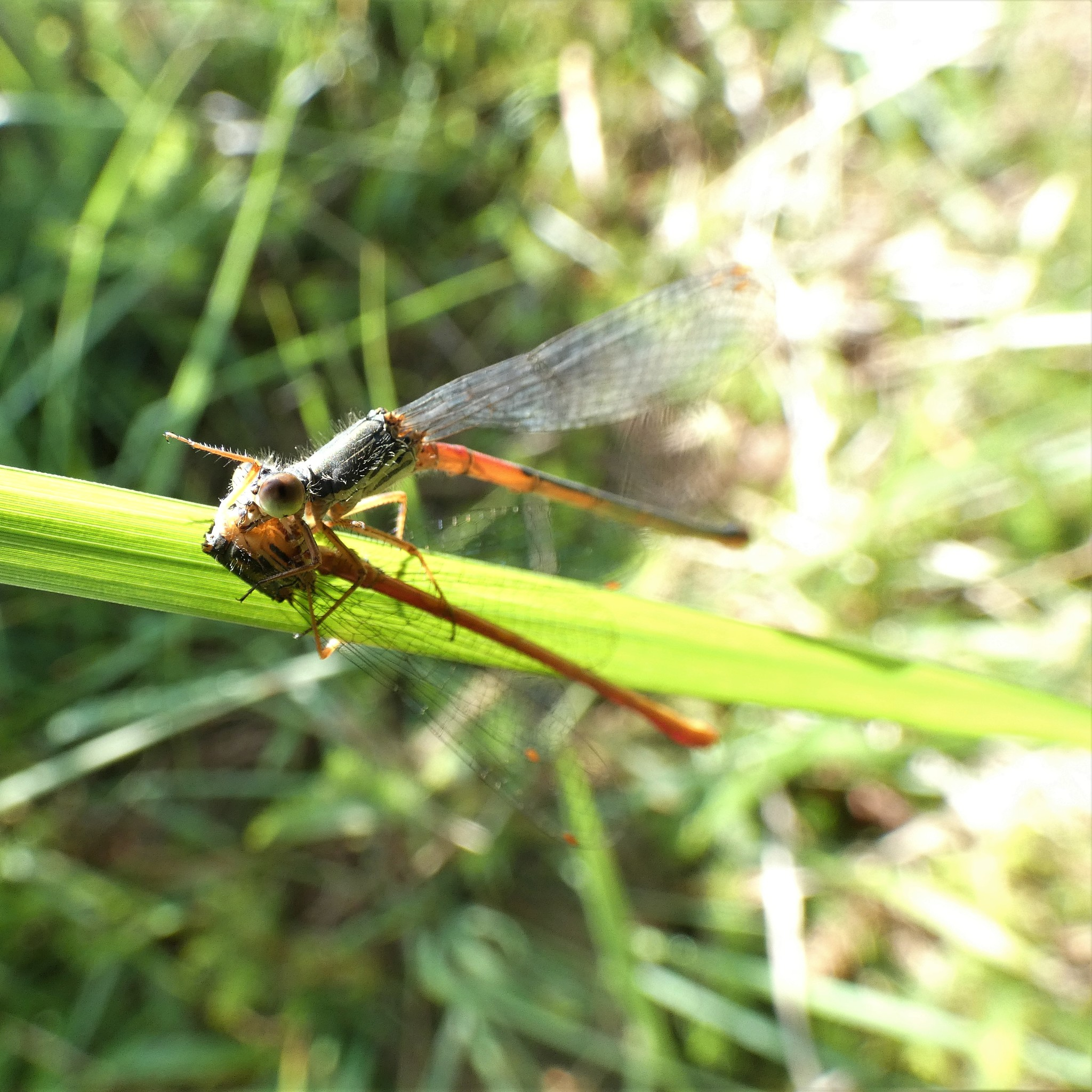
Small red damselfly

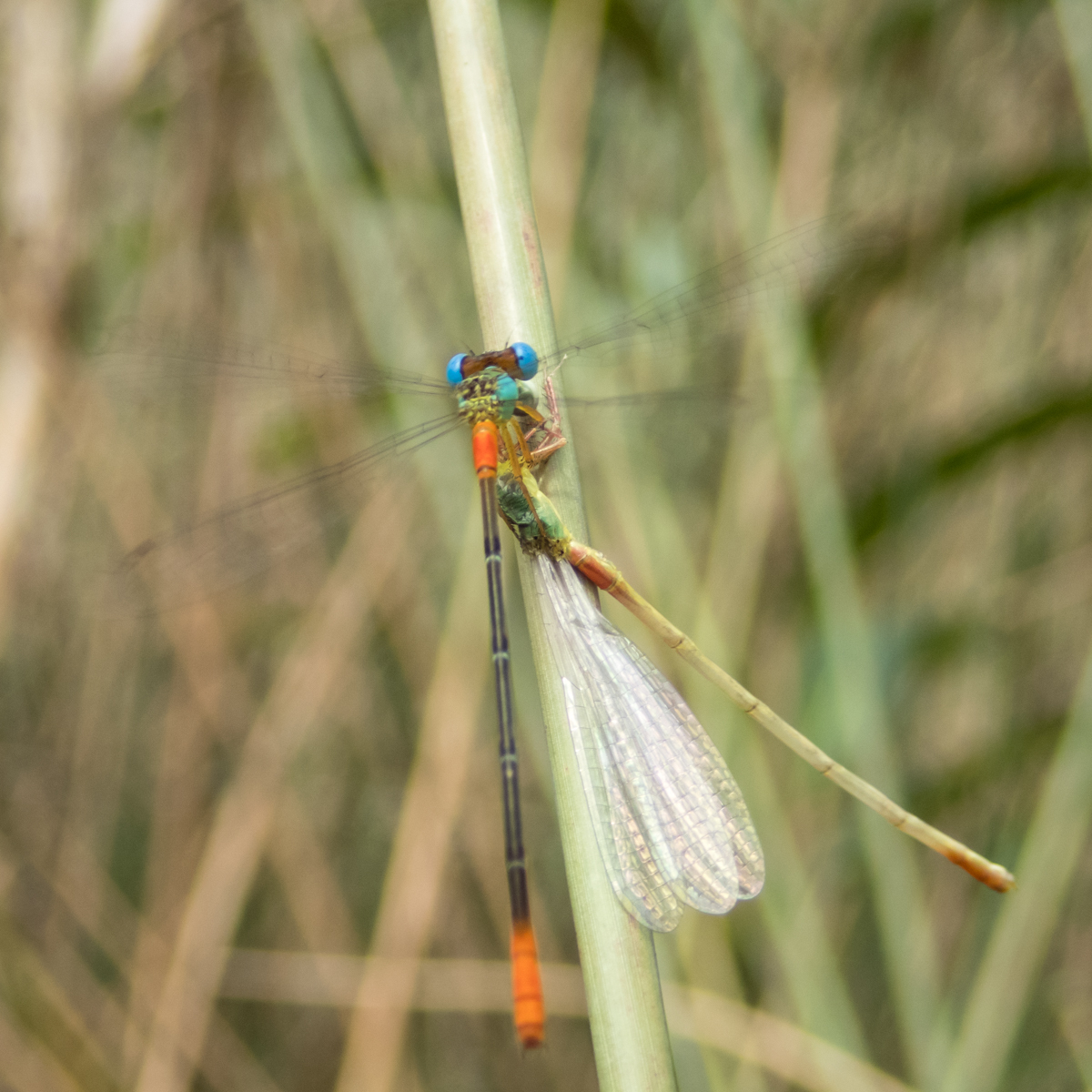
Orange-tailed marsh dart

== See also ==
Various lists of Odonata species of different regions:

- Australia
- Britain
- Canadian dragonflies
- Canadian damselflies
- Estonia
- Finland
- France
- India
- Ireland
- Slovenia
- South Africa
- Sri Lanka
- Taiwan

== Cited sources ==
- Lohmann, H. (1996). "Das phylogenetische System der Anisoptera (Odonata)". Deutsche Entomologische Zeitschrift. 106 (9): 209–266.
- Rehn, A. (2003). "Phylogenetic analysis of higher-level relationships of Odonata". Systematic Entomology. 28 (2): 181–240. Bibcode:2003SysEn..28..181R. doi:10.1046/j.1365-3113.2003.00210.x.
- Trueman, John W. H. (2008). "Pterygote Higher Relationships". Tree of Life Web Project. Archived from the original on 15 July 2017.
- Trueman, John W. H.; Rowe, Richard J. (20 March 2008). "Odonata. Dragonflies and damselflies". Tree of Life Web Project.
