= Franciscagrion franciscoi =

Conservation status
- Critically Endangered (IUCN 3.1)

Scientific classification
- Kingdom: Animalia
- Phylum: Arthropoda
- Clade: Pancrustacea
- Class: Insecta
- Order: Odonata
- Suborder: Zygoptera
- Family: Coenagrionidae
- Genus: Franciscagrion
- Species: F. franciscoi

Binomial name
- Franciscagrion franciscoi Machado & Bedê, 2016

Species of damselfly

Franciscagrion franciscoi is a species of damselfly in the family Coenagrionidae. It is only known from one area in Serra da Canastra National Park, and is critically endangered.

== Taxonomy and etymology ==
Franciscagrion franciscoi was formally described in 2016 by Angelo B.M. Machado and Lúcio Cadaval Bedê. Type specimens were collected from the source of the São Francisco River, which is in Serra da Canastra National Park, Minas Gerais, Brazil. Both the genus name and the specific name are a reference to the river.

== Description ==
Males of the species have an abdominal length of 19-20.5 mm and a 13-13.5 mm long hindwing. In females, the respective lengths are 18-19.4 mm and 13.3-13.6 mm.

The face is mostly gray-green, apart from two black dots in front of a transverse stripe of the same color on the back part of the postclypeus. The top of the head is black except for some yellowish marks, and the back is yellowish-white.

All of the wings are clear with a gray pterostigma, and the legs are whitish yellow.

Most of the abdomen (segments 1-6) is black on top and ringed with black on the end. The second and third segments are green on the side while the fourth through the sixth are blue. The third segment has two flagella on the top half of the sides. The seventh segment is black with a blue line on the half closer to the center of the body. The eighth and ninth segments are blue on the top and sides. In females, these segments have a minute, gray-blue spot on the underside, closer to the head on the eighth and further on the ninth. The last segment follows the previous pattern in males but is gray-blue in females, and it has a notch on the far end of the front. It has a black cercus which appears spatula-shaped when viewed from above, with a yellow-brown pad at the end. The well-developed paraprocts are almost rectangular in shape.

== Conservation ==
The IUCN lists Franciscagrion franciscoi as critcally endangered. It is only known from one habitat, and it regularly receives tourists. Trash has also been observed on the edges of the stream close to its spring.
