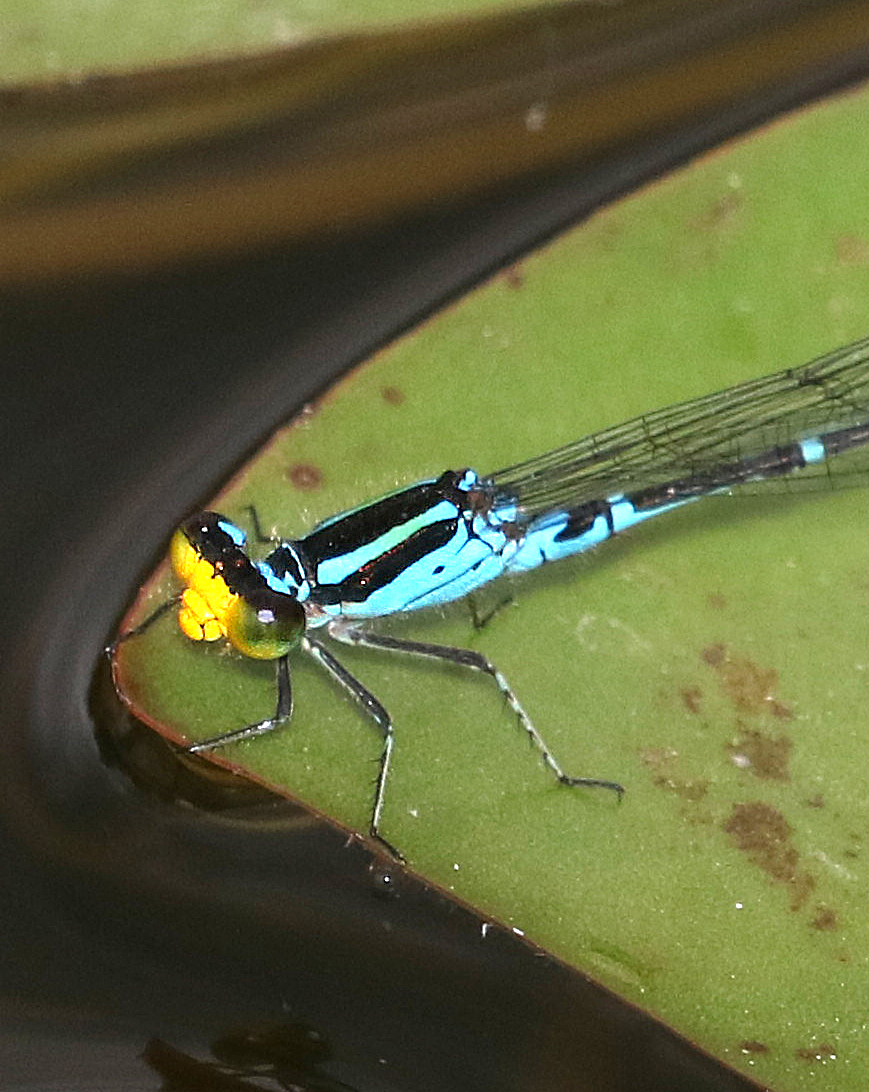
- Neoerythromma cultellatum, Hidalgo, Texas

Conservation status
- Least Concern (IUCN 3.1)

Scientific classification
- Kingdom: Animalia
- Phylum: Arthropoda
- Class: Insecta
- Order: Odonata
- Suborder: Zygoptera
- Family: Coenagrionidae
- Genus: Neoerythromma
- Species: N. cultellatum

Binomial name
- Neoerythromma cultellatum (Hagen in Selys, 1876)

= Neoerythromma cultellatum =

Species of damselfly

Neoerythromma cultellatum, the Caribbean yellowface, is a species of narrow-winged damselfly in the family Coenagrionidae. It is found in the Caribbean, Central America, North America, and South America.

The IUCN conservation status of Neoerythromma cultellatum is "LC", least concern, with no immediate threat to the species' survival. The population is stable. The IUCN status was reviewed in 2017.
