= Teinobasis alluaudi =

Conservation status
- Least Concern (IUCN 3.1)

Scientific classification
- Kingdom: Animalia
- Phylum: Arthropoda
- Class: Insecta
- Order: Odonata
- Suborder: Zygoptera
- Family: Coenagrionidae
- Genus: Teinobasis
- Species: T. alluaudi

Binomial name
- Teinobasis alluaudi (Martin, 1896)

Species of damselfly

Teinobasis alluaudi is a species of damselfly in family Coenagrionidae. It is found in Kenya, Madagascar, Malawi, Seychelles, and Tanzania. Its natural habitats are subtropical or tropical moist lowland forests and shrub-dominated wetlands. It is threatened by habitat loss.
