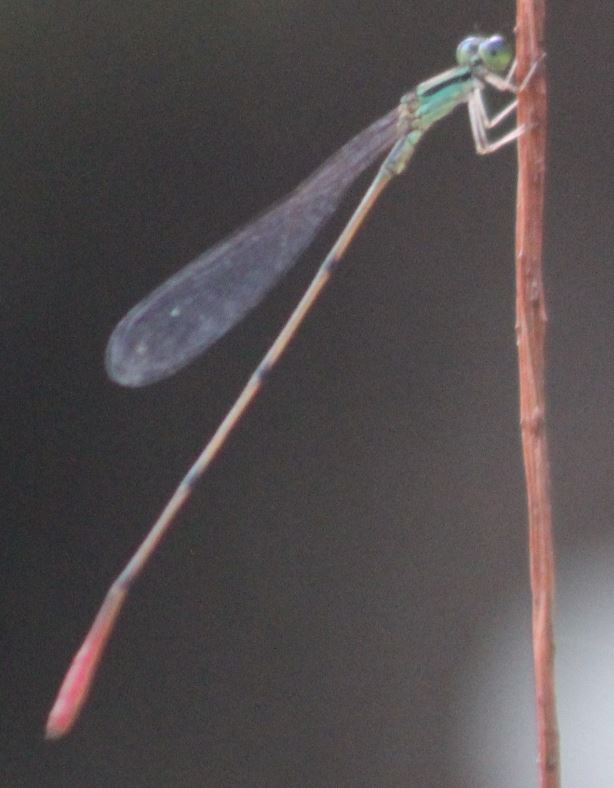
- A male L. lucifer in Loxahatchee NWR, Palm Beach County, FL.

Scientific classification
- Kingdom: Animalia
- Phylum: Arthropoda
- Class: Insecta
- Order: Odonata
- Suborder: Zygoptera
- Family: Coenagrionidae
- Genus: Leptobasis
- Species: L. lucifer

Binomial name
- Leptobasis lucifer (Donnelly, 1967)

= Leptobasis lucifer =

Species of damselfly

Leptobasis lucifer, commonly referred to as lucifer swampdamsel, is a relatively long and slender species of narrow-winged damselfly in the genus Leptobasis found in Central America, southern parts of Mexico, as well as locally in Southern Florida. L. lucifer prefers swampy woodland habitats, such as cypress swamps and tend to hunt near trees, scanning and hovering around leaves in search for prey. Males have black striping on a green thorax with a bright red patch near the end of the abdomen, whereas females are more variable: ranging from dull greenish brown, to blue and reddish orange, to even green with a blue ring around the abdomen. Adult females of this species have a large ovipositor and immatures of both sexes have pale blueish in replacement for any green or greenish patches that would be visible in the adult stage.

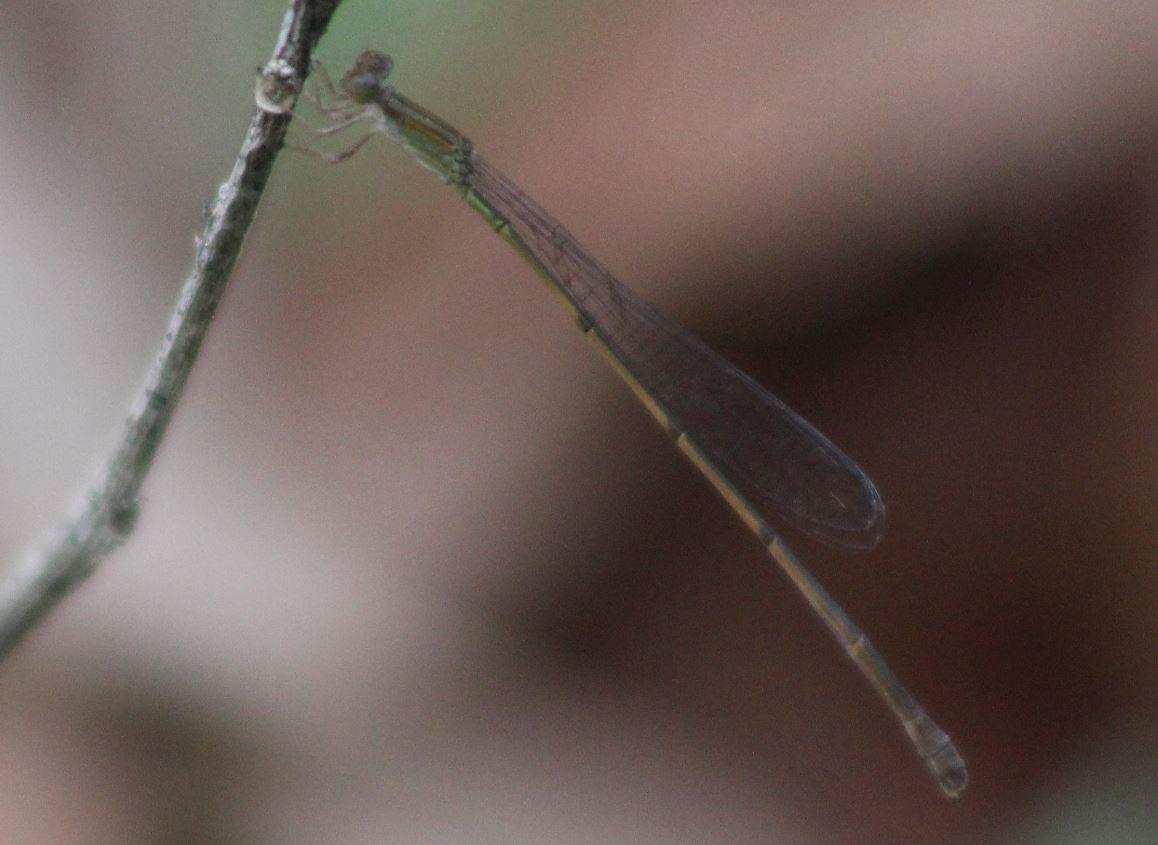
Female L. lucifer in Loxahatchee NWR, Palm Beach County, FL
