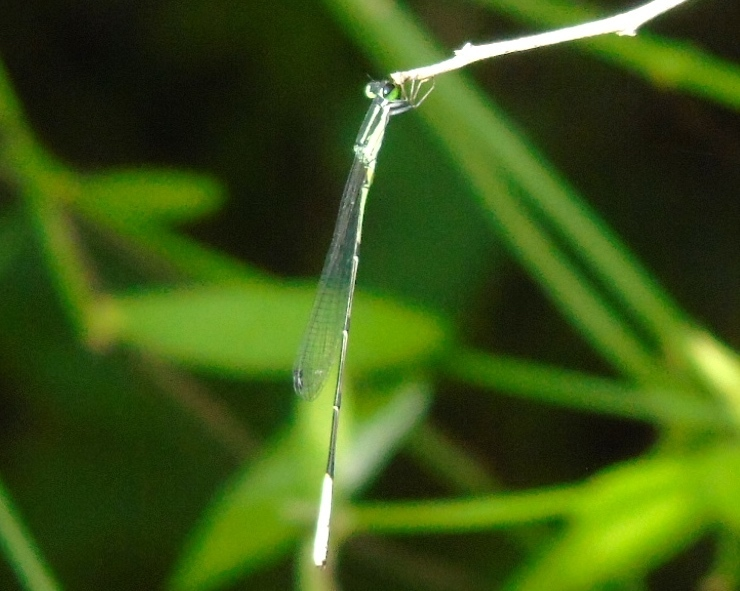

Conservation status
- Vulnerable (IUCN 3.1)

Scientific classification
- Kingdom: Animalia
- Phylum: Arthropoda
- Class: Insecta
- Order: Odonata
- Suborder: Zygoptera
- Family: Coenagrionidae
- Genus: Leptobasis
- Species: L. melinogaster

Binomial name
- Leptobasis melinogaster Gonzalez-Soriano, 2002

= Leptobasis melinogaster =

Species of damselfly

Leptobasis melinogaster, the cream-tipped swampdamsel, is a species of damselfly in the family Coenagrionidae. It is found in Mexico and the United States. Its natural habitats are intermittent rivers and freshwater marshes.
