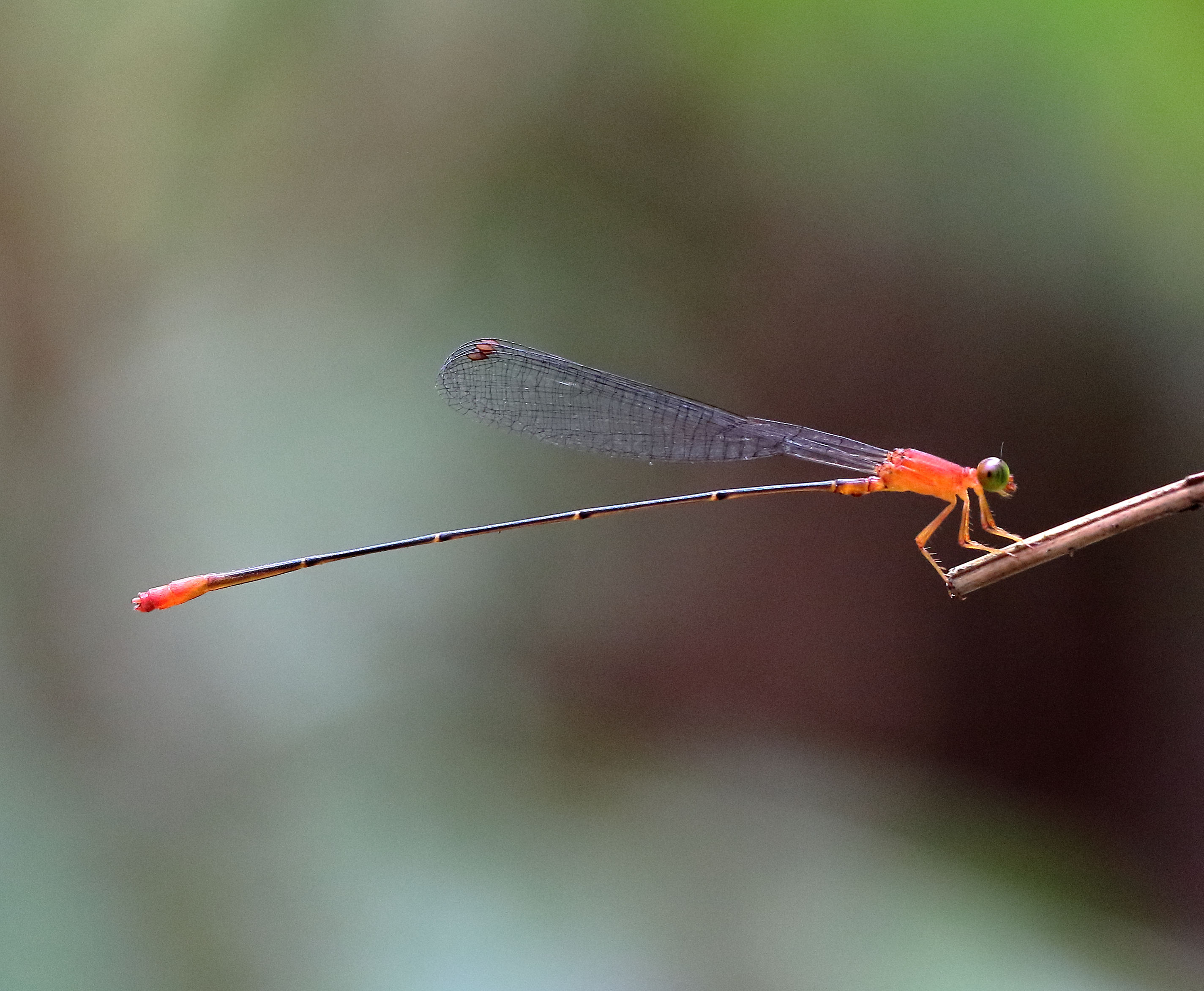
- Male, Cairns

Conservation status
- Least Concern (IUCN 3.1)

Scientific classification
- Kingdom: Animalia
- Phylum: Arthropoda
- Clade: Pancrustacea
- Class: Insecta
- Order: Odonata
- Suborder: Zygoptera
- Family: Coenagrionidae
- Genus: Teinobasis
- Species: T. rufithorax

Binomial name
- Teinobasis rufithorax (Selys, 1877)

Synonyms
- Telebasis rufithorax Selys, 1877

= Teinobasis rufithorax =

Red-breasted longtail

Species of damselfly

Teinobasis rufithorax is a species of damselfly in the family Coenagrionidae, commonly known as a red-breasted longtail. It is found on Cape York Peninsula, in Queensland, Australia, and on Torres Strait islands, Maluku Island, Aru Islands, New Guinea, Bismarck Archipelago and the Solomon Islands. It inhabits shaded, deep waters.

Teinobasis rufithorax is a medium-sized damselfly, with an orange body and an orange-red tip to its tail.

== Etymology ==
The genus name Teinobasis is derived from the Greek τείνω (teinō, "to stretch") and βάσις (basis, "base" or "foundation"), referring to the long base of the wings.

The species name rufithorax is derived from the Latin rufus ("red" or "ruddy") and Greek θώραξ (thōrax, "chest" or "thorax"), referring to the reddish colour of its thorax.

== Gallery ==
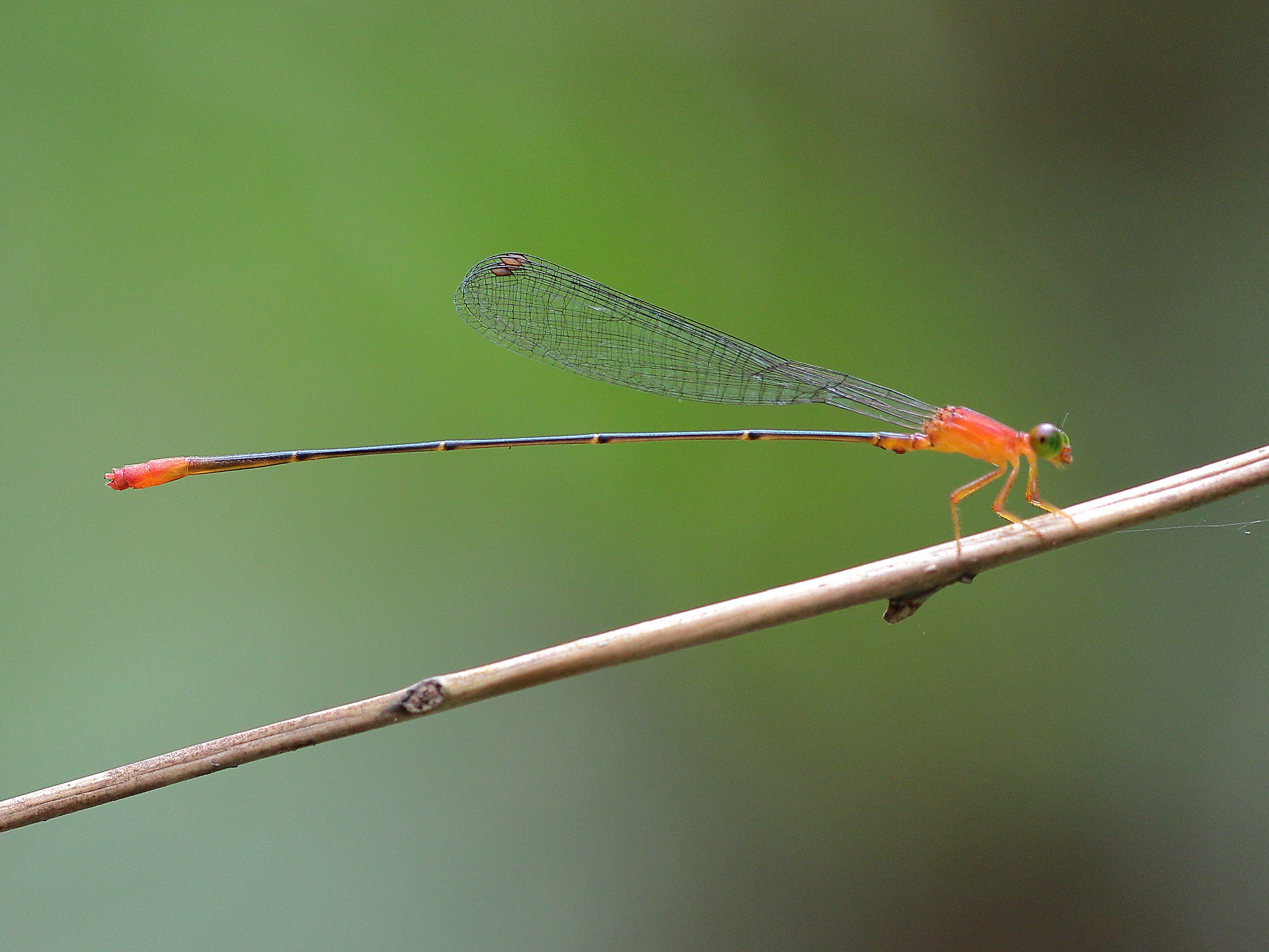
Male

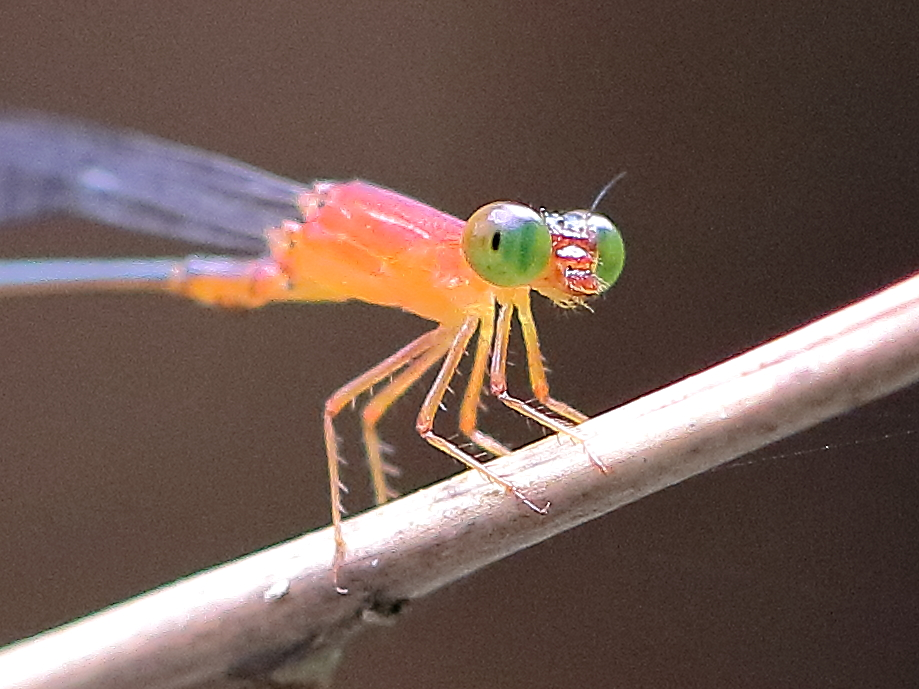
Male, face and thorax

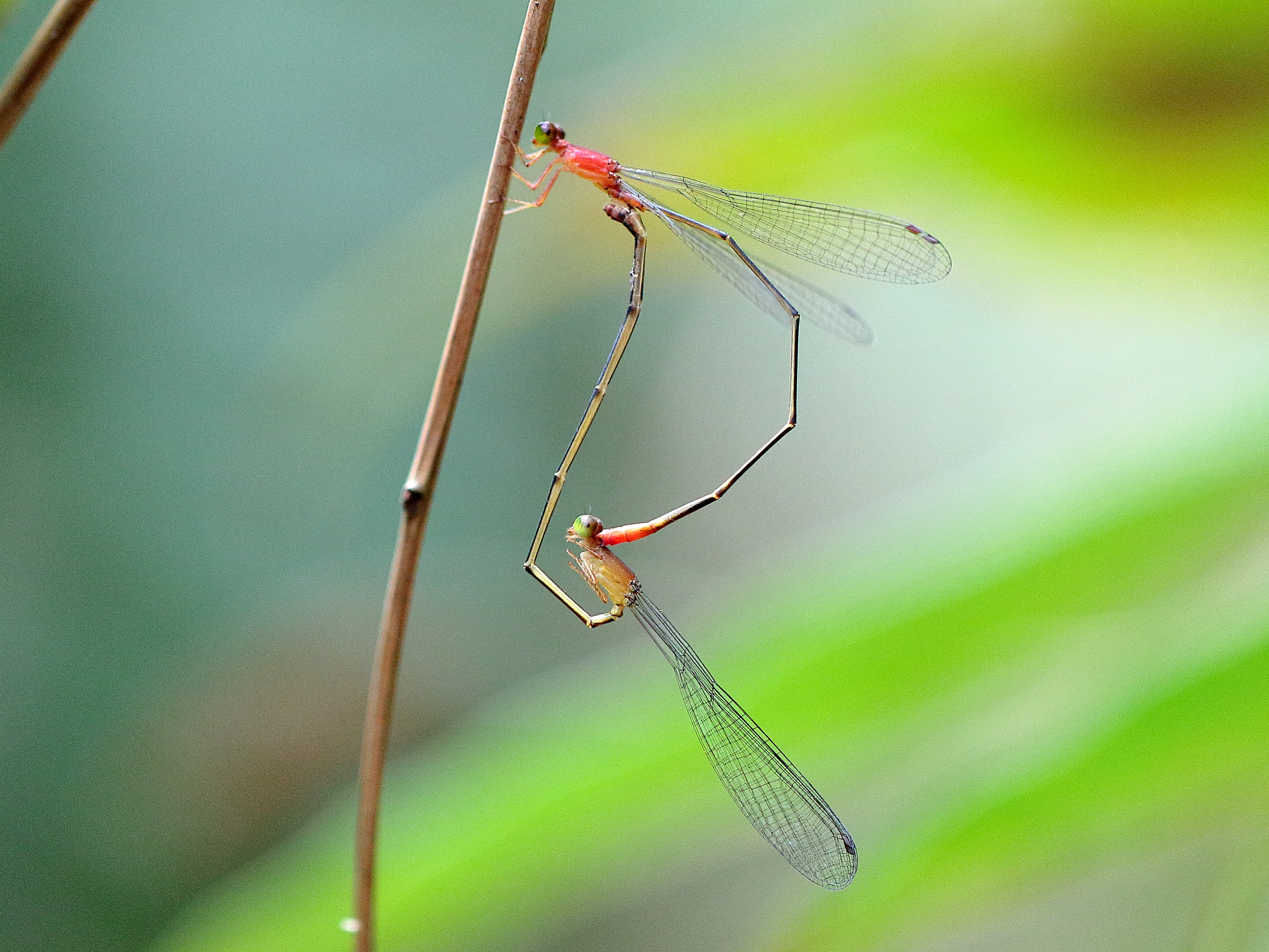
Mating pair, male upper, female lower

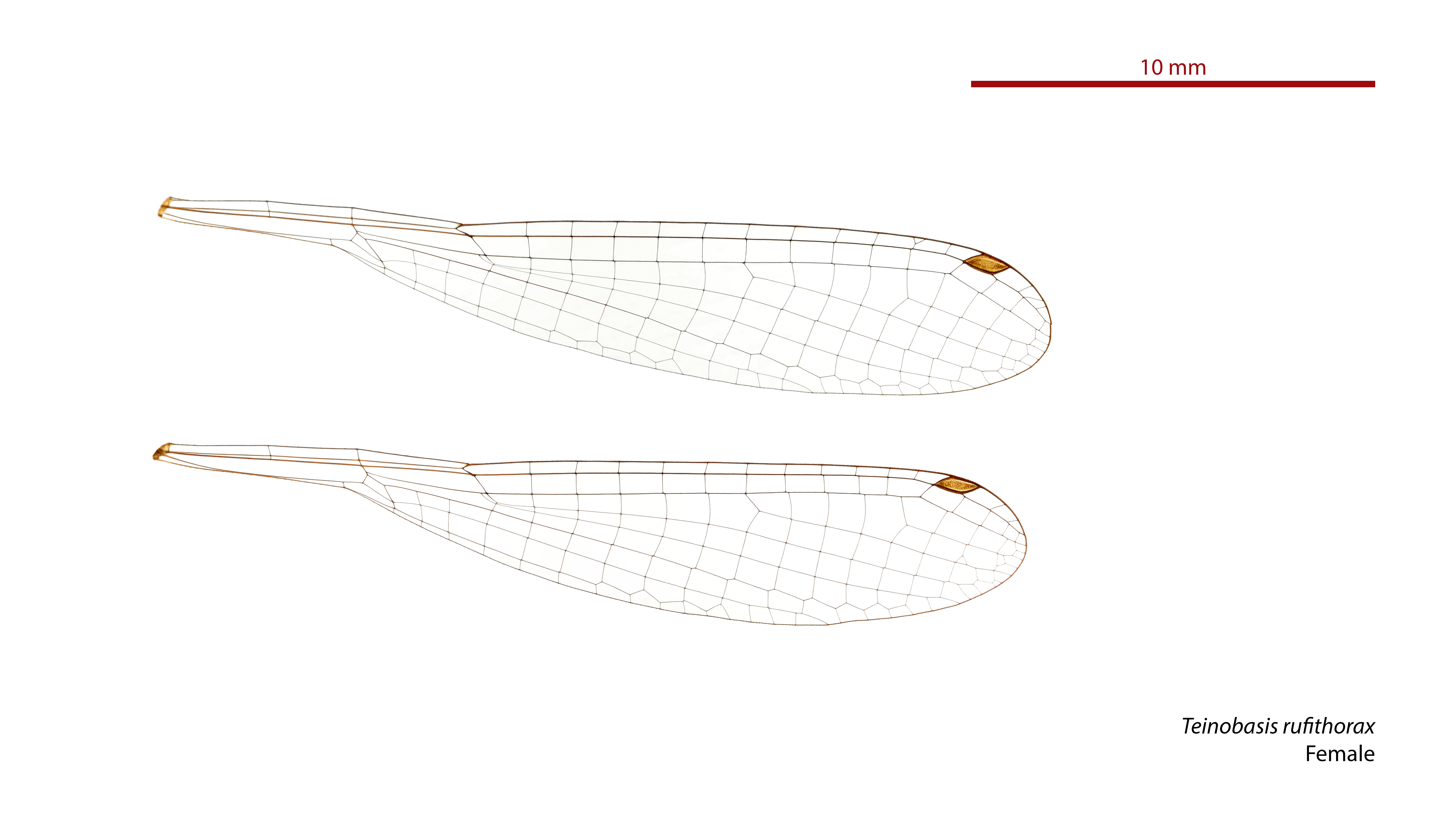
Female wings

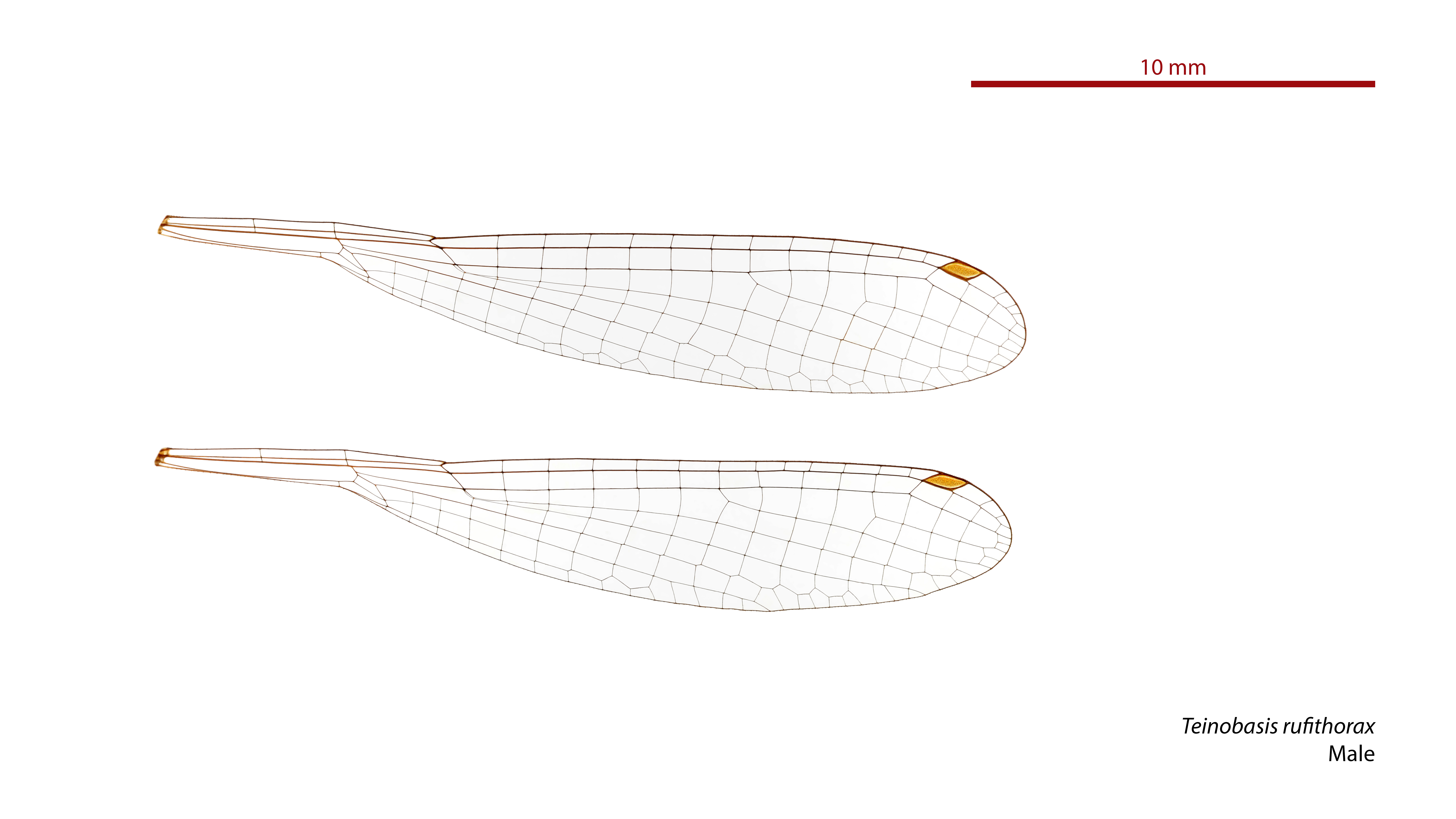
Male wings

== See also ==
- List of Odonata species of Australia
