= Proneura =

Conservation status
- Data Deficient (IUCN 3.1)

Scientific classification
- Kingdom: Animalia
- Phylum: Arthropoda
- Class: Insecta
- Order: Odonata
- Suborder: Zygoptera
- Family: Coenagrionidae
- Genus: Proneura; Selys, 1889
- Species: P. prolongata

Binomial name
- Proneura prolongata Selys, 1889

Species of damselfly

Proneura prolongata is a species of damselfly in the family Coenagrionidae . It is the only species in the genus Proneura. It is found in possibly Brazil and possibly Peru. Its natural habitat is rivers.
