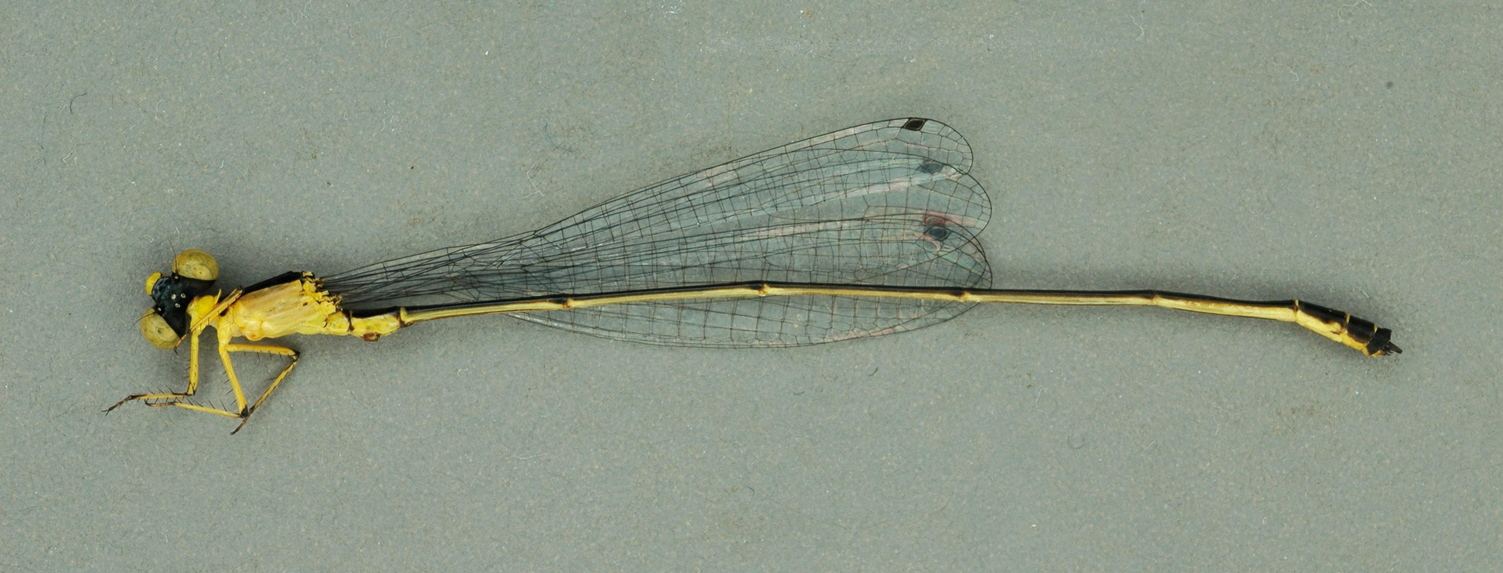
- Teinobasis sjupp

Scientific classification
- Kingdom: Animalia
- Phylum: Arthropoda
- Clade: Pancrustacea
- Class: Insecta
- Order: Odonata
- Suborder: Zygoptera
- Family: Coenagrionidae
- Genus: Teinobasis; Kirby, 1890

= Teinobasis =

Genus of damselflies

Teinobasis is a genus of damselflies in the family Coenagrionidae. Species occur in south-eastern Asia, Indonesia, Solomon Islands and Micronesia; one species, Teinobasis rufithorax, is found in Australia.

== Etymology ==
The genus name Teinobasis is derived from the Greek τείνω (teinō, "to stretch") and βάσις (basis, "base" or "foundation"), referring to the long base of the wings.

== Species ==
The genus Teinobasis includes the following species:

- Teinobasis aerides Lieftinck, 1962
- Teinobasis albula Ris, 1915
- Teinobasis alluaudi (Martin, 1896)
- Teinobasis alternans Lieftinck, 1935
- Teinobasis aluensis Campion, 1924
- Teinobasis angusticlavia Ris, 1913
- Teinobasis annamalija Hämäläinen & Müller, 1989
- Teinobasis argiocnemis Lieftinck, 1949
- Teinobasis ariel Lieftinck, 1962
- Teinobasis aurea Lieftinck, 1932
- Teinobasis bradleyi Kimmins, 1957
- Teinobasis budeni Paulson, 2003
- Teinobasis buwaldai Lieftinck, 1949
- Teinobasis carolinensis Lieftinck, 1962
- Teinobasis chionopleura Lieftinck, 1987
- Teinobasis combusta (Selys, 1877)
- Teinobasis corolla Needham & Gyger, 1939
- Teinobasis cryptica Dow, 2010
- Teinobasis debeauforti Lieftinck, 1938
- Teinobasis debeauxi Lieftinck, 1938
- Teinobasis dolabrata Lieftinck, 1938
- Teinobasis dominula Lieftinck, 1937
- Teinobasis euglena Lieftinck, 1934
- Teinobases fatakula Marinov and Donnelly, 2013
- Teinobasis filamenta Needham & Gyger, 1939
- Teinobasis filiformis (Brauer, 1868)
- Teinobasis filum (Brauer, 1868)
- Teinobasis fortis Lieftinck, 1962
- Teinobasis fulgens Lieftinck, 1949
- Teinobasis gracillima Fraser, 1926
- Teinobasis hamalaineni Müller, 1992
- Teinobasis helvola Lieftinck, 1930
- Teinobasis imitans Lieftinck, 1987
- Teinobasis kiautai Theischinger & Richards, 2007
- Teinobasis kirbyi Laidlaw, 1902
- Teinobasis laglaizei (Selys, 1878)
- Teinobasis laidlawi Kimmins, 1936
- Teinobasis lorquini (Selys, 1877)
- Teinobasis luciae Lieftinck, 1937
- Teinobasis metallica (Förster, 1898)
- Teinobasis micans Lieftinck, 1949
- Teinobasis nigra Campion in Laidlaw, 1928
- Teinobasis nigrolutea Lieftinck, 1962
- Teinobasis nitescens Lieftinck, 1935
- Teinobasis obtusilingua Lieftinck, 1987
- Teinobasis olivacea Ris, 1915
- Teinobasis olthofi Lieftinck, 1949
- Teinobasis palauensis Lieftinck, 1962
- Teinobasis ponapensis Lieftinck, 1962
- Teinobasis pretiosa (Selys, 1877)
- Teinobasis prothoracica (Selys, 1877)
- Teinobasis pulverulenta Ris, 1915
- Teinobasis rajah Laidlaw, 1912
- Teinobasis ranee Needham & Gyger, 1941
- Teinobasis recurva (Selys, 1877)
- Teinobasis rubricauda Lieftinck, 1974
- Teinobasis ruficollis (Selys, 1877)
- Teinobasis rufithorax (Selys, 1877) - red-breasted longtail
- Teinobasis samaritis Ris, 1915
- Teinobasis scintillans Lieftinck, 1932
- Teinobasis serena Lieftinck, 1932
- Teinobasis simulans Lieftinck, 1987
- Teinobasis sjupp Kalkman, 2008
- Teinobasis stigmatizans Lieftinck, 1938
- Teinobasis strigosa Needham & Gyger, 1939
- Teinobasis suavis Lieftinck, 1953
- Teinobasis superba (Hagen in Selys, 1877)
- Teinobasis tenuis (Martin, 1897)
- Teinobasis wallacei Campion, 1924
