= Oreocnemis =

Scientific classification
- Kingdom: Animalia
- Phylum: Arthropoda
- Clade: Pancrustacea
- Class: Insecta
- Order: Odonata
- Suborder: Zygoptera
- Family: Platycnemididae
- Genus: Oreocnemis

Genus of damselflies

Oreocnemis is a monotypic genus of damselfly in the family, Coenagrionidae. It contains only Oreocnemis phoenix.

Oreocnemis phoenix is endemic to the plateau of Mulanje, Malawi. It was discovered by Philip Mhlanga in December 1970. The generic name comes from the Greek oros, meaning mountain, and the specific from the male's bright-red coloration.

== Sources ==
- Dijkstra, Klaas-Douwe B. (2004). "Dragonflies (Odonata) of Mulanje, Malawi" (PDF). IDF-Report. 6: 23–29.
