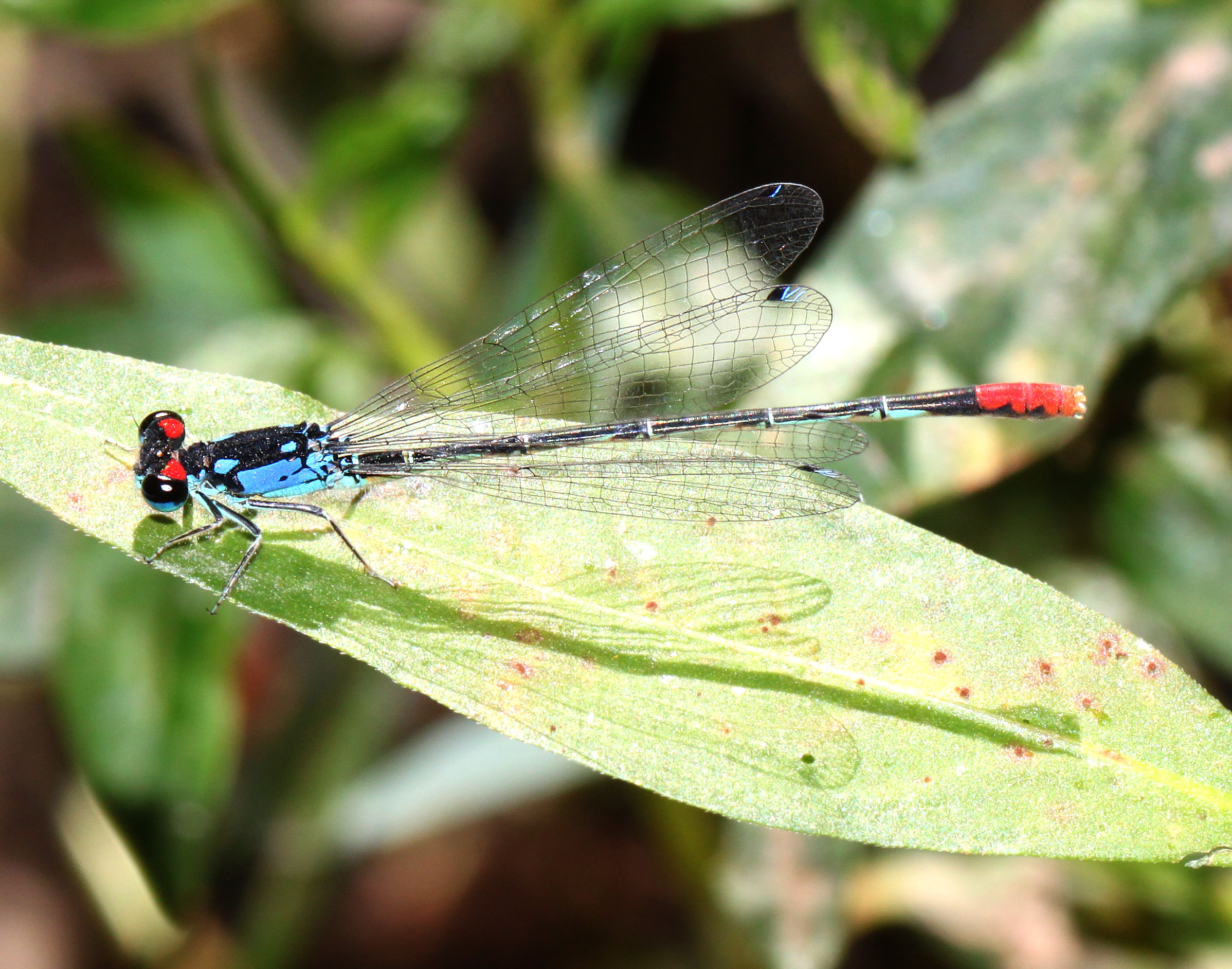
- Hesperagrion heterodoxum

Scientific classification
- Domain: Eukaryota
- Kingdom: Animalia
- Phylum: Arthropoda
- Class: Insecta
- Order: Odonata
- Suborder: Zygoptera
- Family: Coenagrionidae
- Genus: Hesperagrion; Calvert, 1902

= Hesperagrion =

Genus of damselflies

Hesperagrion is a genus of painted damsels in the damselfly family Coenagrionidae. There are at least two described species in Hesperagrion.

== Species ==
These two species belong to the genus Hesperagrion:

- Hesperagrion heterodoxum (Selys, 1868) (painted damsel)
- † Hesperagrion praevolans Cockerell, 1907
