= Melanesobasis =

Scientific classification
- Kingdom: Animalia
- Phylum: Arthropoda
- Class: Insecta
- Order: Odonata
- Suborder: Zygoptera
- Family: Coenagrionidae
- Genus: Melanesobasis; Donnelly, 1984

Genus of praying mantises

Melanesobasis is a genus of damselflies in the family Coenagrionidae. Species are endemic to the Fiji Islands and Vanuatu. These damselflies inhabit fast‐moving forested streams at medium to high elevations (100–750 m).

== Species ==
The Global Biodiversity Information Facility lists:

- Melanesobasis annulata (Brauer, 1869)
- Melanesobasis bicellulare Donnelly, 1984
- Melanesobasis corniculata (Tillyard, 1924) (type species)
  - M. corniculata marginata Donnelly, 1984
- Melanesobasis flavilabris (Selys, 1891)
- Melanesobasis maculosa Donnelly, 1984
- Melanesobasis mcleani Donnelly, 1984
- Melanesobasis prolixa Donnelly, 1984
- Melanesobasis simmondsi (Tillyard, 1924)
