= Junix =

Conservation status
- Data Deficient (IUCN 3.1)

Scientific classification
- Kingdom: Animalia
- Phylum: Arthropoda
- Class: Insecta
- Order: Odonata
- Suborder: Zygoptera
- Family: Coenagrionidae
- Genus: Junix; Rácenis, 1968
- Species: J. elumbis

Binomial name
- Junix elumbis Rácenis, 1968

Genus of damselflies

Junix is a genus of damselfly in the family Coenagrionidae. The only species is Junix elumbis. It is endemic to Venezuela. It occupies moist, lowland habitats that are subtropical or tropical, usually near forests or rivers.
