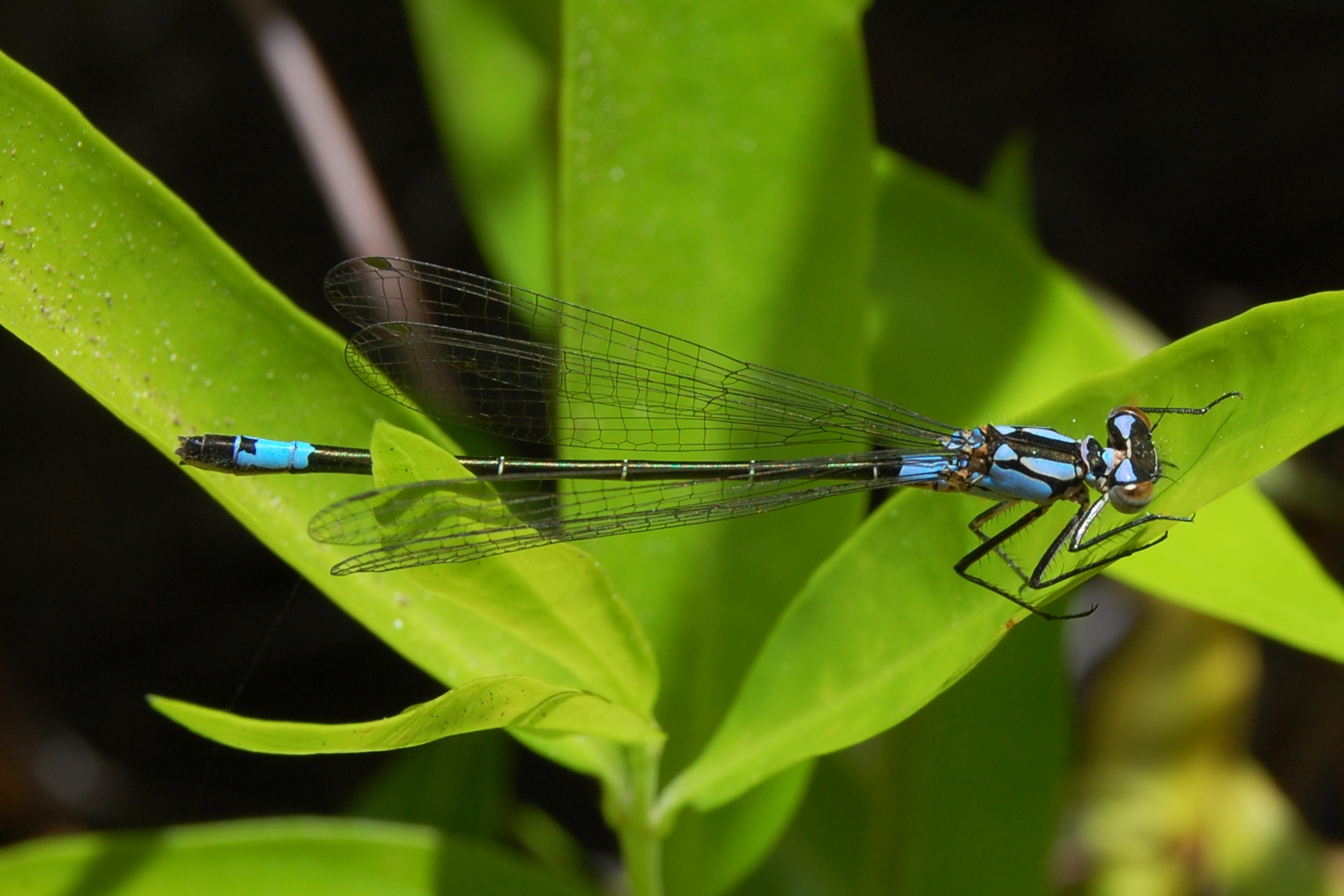
- Zoniagrion exclamationis

Scientific classification
- Domain: Eukaryota
- Kingdom: Animalia
- Phylum: Arthropoda
- Class: Insecta
- Order: Odonata
- Suborder: Zygoptera
- Family: Coenagrionidae
- Genus: Zoniagrion; Kennedy, 1917
- Species: Z. exclamationis

Binomial name
- Zoniagrion exclamationis (Selys, 1876)

= Zoniagrion =

Genus of damselflies

Zoniagrion exclamationis, the exclamation damsel, is a species of damselfly in the family Coenagrionidae, and is the only species in the genus Zoniagrion.

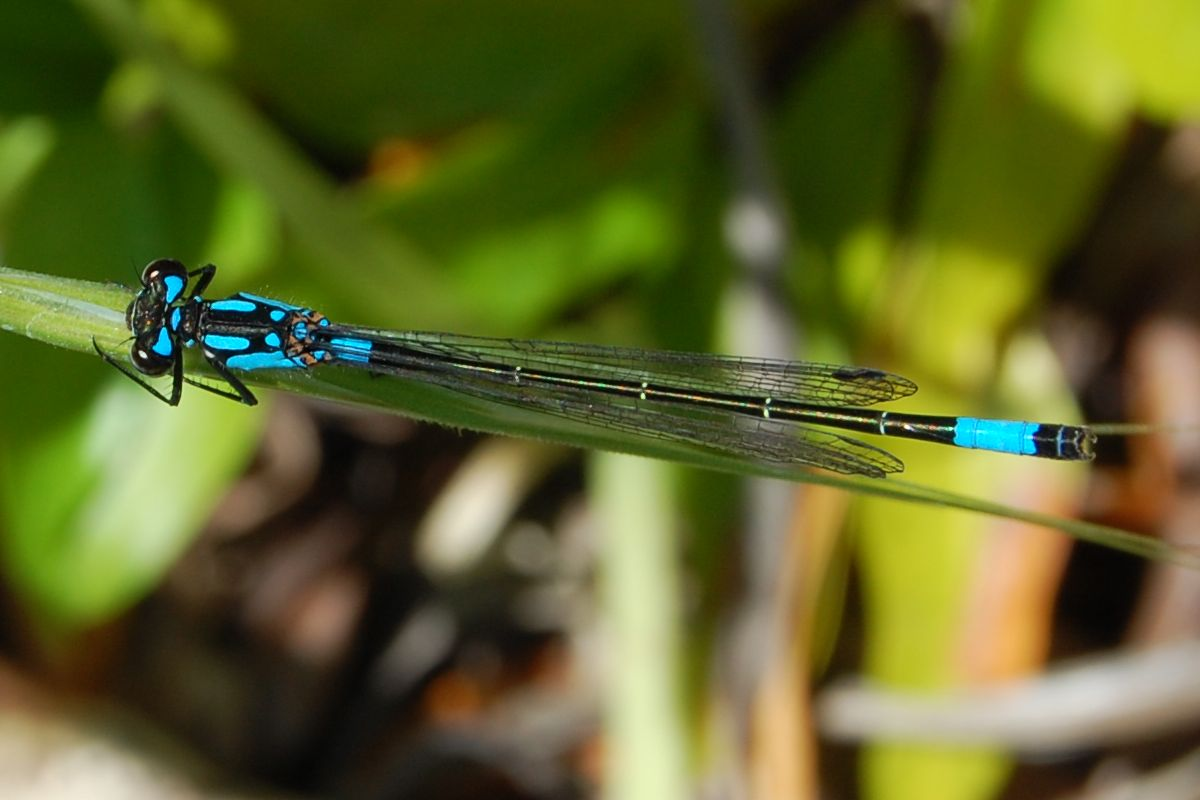
Zoniagrion exclamationis
