= Pseudostigma =

Scientific classification
- Kingdom: Animalia
- Phylum: Arthropoda
- Class: Insecta
- Order: Odonata
- Suborder: Zygoptera
- Family: Coenagrionidae
- Genus: Pseudostigma; Selys, 1860

Genus of damselflies

Pseudostigma is a genus of damselflies in the family Coenagrionidae that is found in Mexico and Central America. There are at least two described species in Pseudostigma.

== Species ==
These two species belong to the genus Pseudostigma:

- Pseudostigma aberrans Selys, 1860
- Pseudostigma accedens Selys, 1860
