= Thaumatagrion =

Scientific classification
- Kingdom: Animalia
- Phylum: Arthropoda
- Clade: Pancrustacea
- Class: Insecta
- Order: Odonata
- Suborder: Zygoptera
- Family: Coenagrionidae
- Genus: Thaumatagrion; Lieftinck, 1932
- Species: T. funereum

Binomial name
- Thaumatagrion funereum Lieftinck, 1932

Genus of damselflies

Thaumatagrion is a genus of white-legged damselfly in the family Coenagrionidae. There is one described species in Thaumatagrion, T. funereum.
