= Neoerythromma =

Scientific classification
- Domain: Eukaryota
- Kingdom: Animalia
- Phylum: Arthropoda
- Class: Insecta
- Order: Odonata
- Suborder: Zygoptera
- Family: Coenagrionidae
- Genus: Neoerythromma; Kennedy, 1920

Genus of damselflies

Neoerythromma is a genus of damselflies in the family Coenagrionidae. There are at least 2 described species in Neoerythromma.

== Species ==
- Neoerythromma cultellatum (Hagen in Selys, 1876) (Caribbean yellowface)
- Neoerythromma gladiolatum Williamson and Williamson, 1930
