= Apanisagrion =

Scientific classification
- Domain: Eukaryota
- Kingdom: Animalia
- Phylum: Arthropoda
- Class: Insecta
- Order: Odonata
- Suborder: Zygoptera
- Family: Coenagrionidae
- Genus: Apanisagrion; Kennedy, 1920
- Species: A. lais

Binomial name
- Apanisagrion lais (Selys, 1876)

Genus of damselflies

Apanisagrion lais, the black-and-white damsel, is a species of damselfly in the family Coenagrionidae, and is the only species in the genus Apanisagrion.
