= Franciscagrion =

Scientific classification
- Kingdom: Animalia
- Phylum: Arthropoda
- Clade: Pancrustacea
- Class: Insecta
- Order: Odonata
- Suborder: Zygoptera
- Family: Coenagrionidae
- Genus: Franciscagrion; Machado & Bedê, 2016

Type species
- Franciscagrion franciscoi Machado & Bedê, 2016

Genus of damselflies

Franciscagrion is a genus of damselflies in the family Coenagrionidae. It contains two species. The type species was collected from the source of São Francisco River, and the genus is named in reference to that river.

== Species ==
Franciscagrion contains the following species:

- Franciscagrion franciscoi Machado & Bedê, 2016
- Franciscagrion longispinum Machado & Bedê, 2016
