= Leptocnemis =

Scientific classification
- Domain: Eukaryota
- Kingdom: Animalia
- Phylum: Arthropoda
- Class: Insecta
- Order: Odonata
- Suborder: Zygoptera
- Family: Coenagrionidae
- Genus: Leptocnemis; Selys, 1886
- Species: L. cyanops

Binomial name
- Leptocnemis cyanops (Selys, 1869)

Genus of damselflies

Leptocnemis is a genus of narrow-winged damselflies in the family Coenagrionidae. There is one described species in Leptocnemis, L. cyanops.
