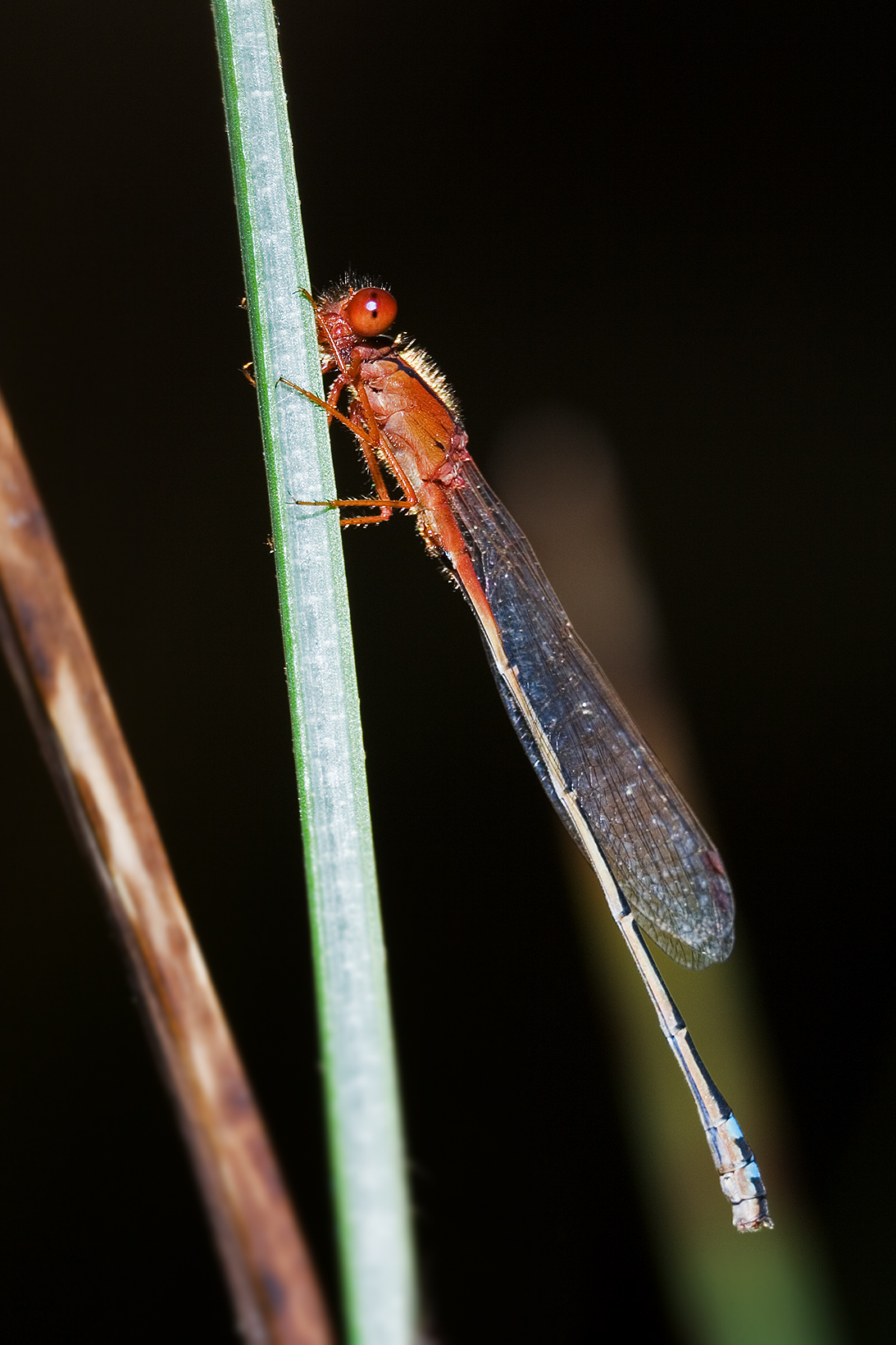
- Male, Tasmania, Australia
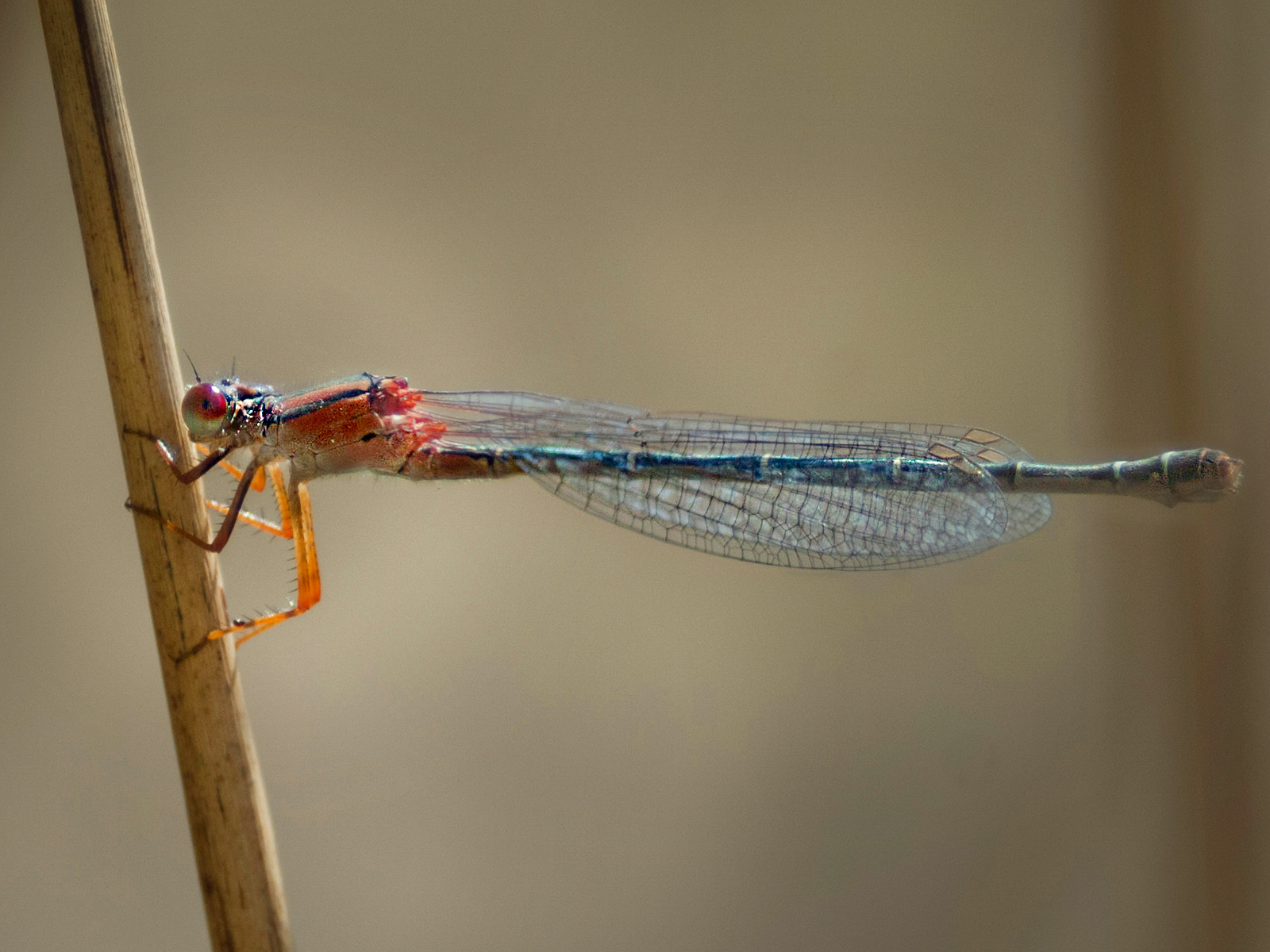
- Female

Conservation status
- Least Concern (IUCN 3.1)

Scientific classification
- Kingdom: Animalia
- Phylum: Arthropoda
- Clade: Pancrustacea
- Class: Insecta
- Order: Odonata
- Suborder: Zygoptera
- Family: Coenagrionidae
- Genus: Xanthagrion; Selys 1876
- Species: X. erythroneurum

Binomial name
- Xanthagrion erythroneurum Selys, 1876

= Red and blue damsel =

Species of damselfly

The red and blue damsel, (Xanthagrion erythroneurum) is a damselfly in the family Coenagrionidae. It is the only member of the monotypic genus Xanthagrion.

== Description ==
A red and blue damsel has a bright red face and thorax. Its abdomen is pale in colour and 2.2-2.4 cm long. Females and males are similar in colour.

== Distribution and habitat ==
The red and blue damsel is widespread across all Australian states, as well as Fiji, New Caledonia, and other islands in the Pacific. It is found in north and eastern Tasmania. It is typically found near dams, marshes and slow watercourses.

== Etymology ==
The genus name Xanthagrion is derived from the Greek ξανθός (xanthos, "yellow") and Agrion, a genus name derived from the Greek ἄγριος (agrios, "wild"). Agrion was the name applied by Johan Christian Fabricius in 1775 to all damselflies.

The species name erythroneurum is derived from the Greek ἐρυθρός (erythros, "red") and νεῦρον (neuron, "nerve" or "sinew"), referring to the colour of the major wing veins.

== Gallery ==
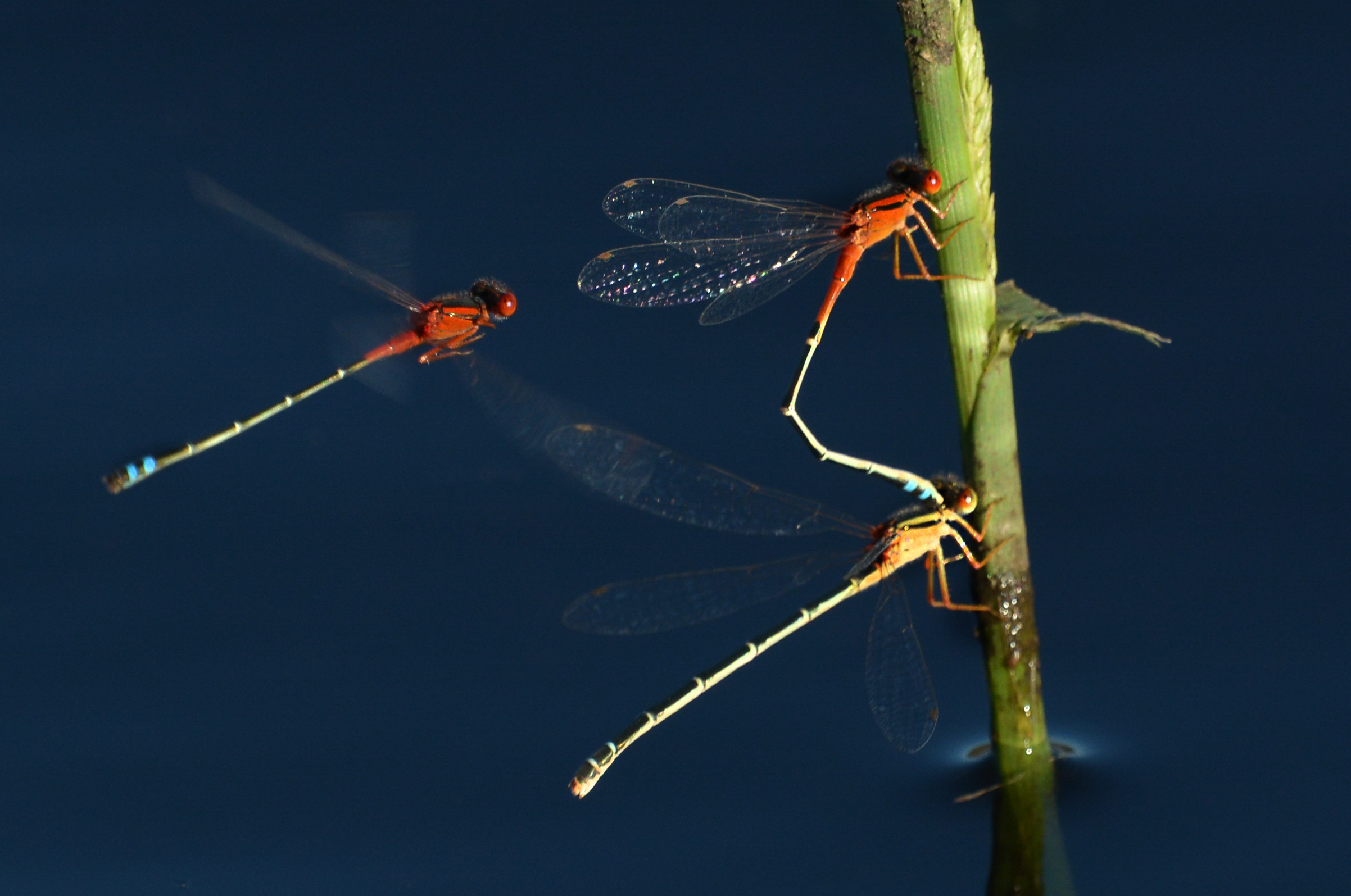
Mating I. The male holds the female behind her head.

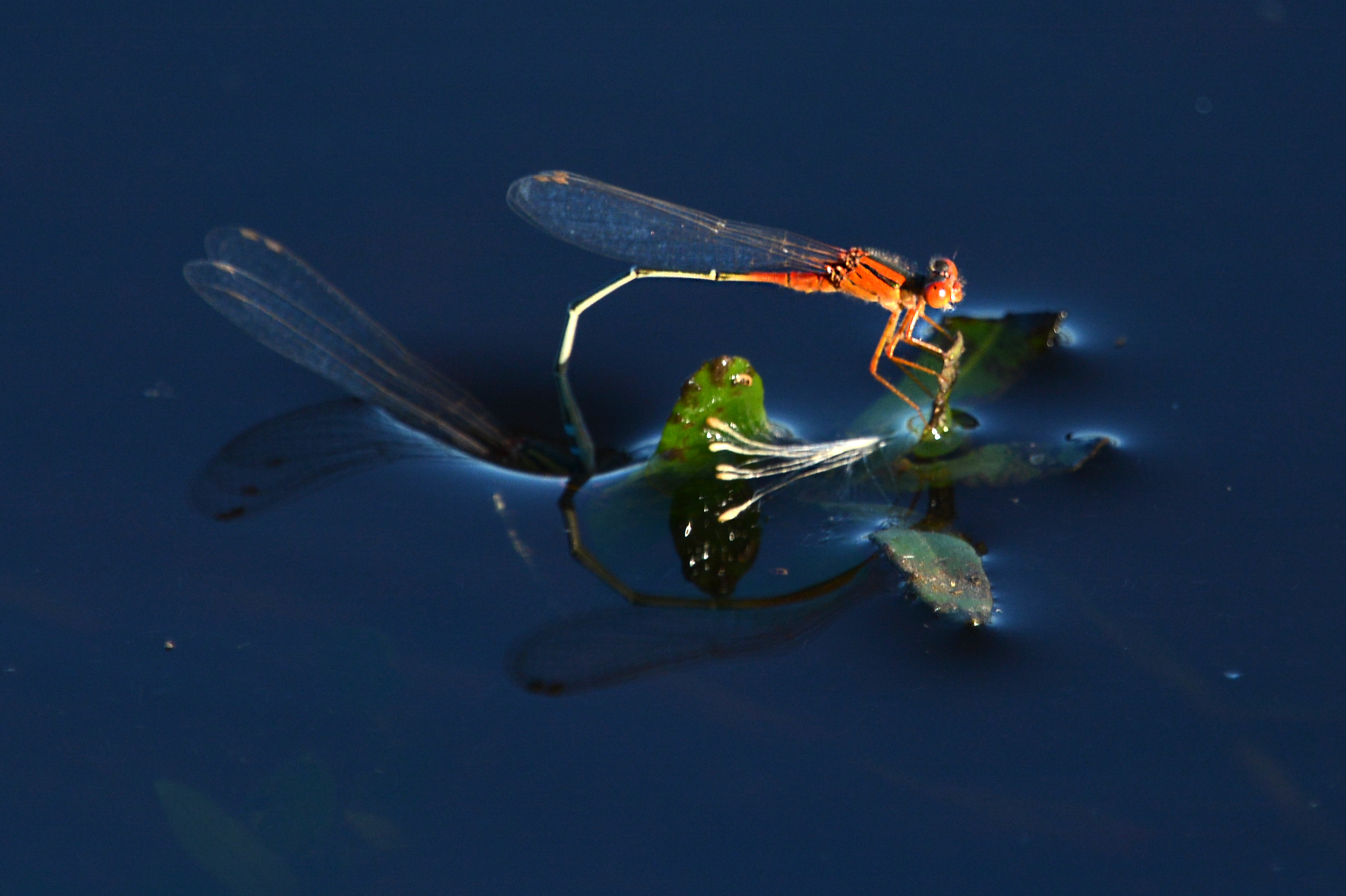
Mating II. The male pushes the female under the water.

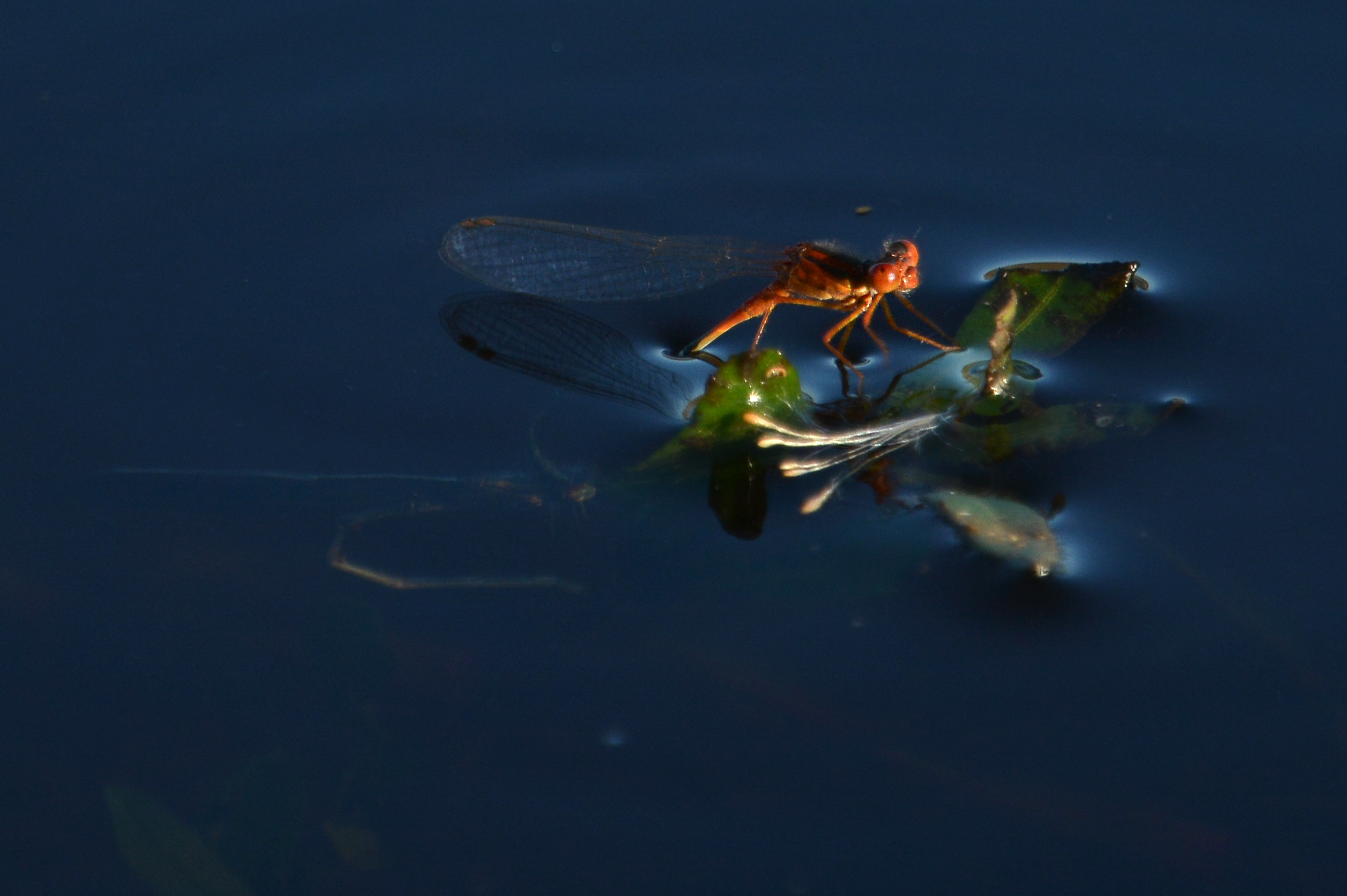
Mating III. The female is completely under the water. Both male and female dragonflies go under.

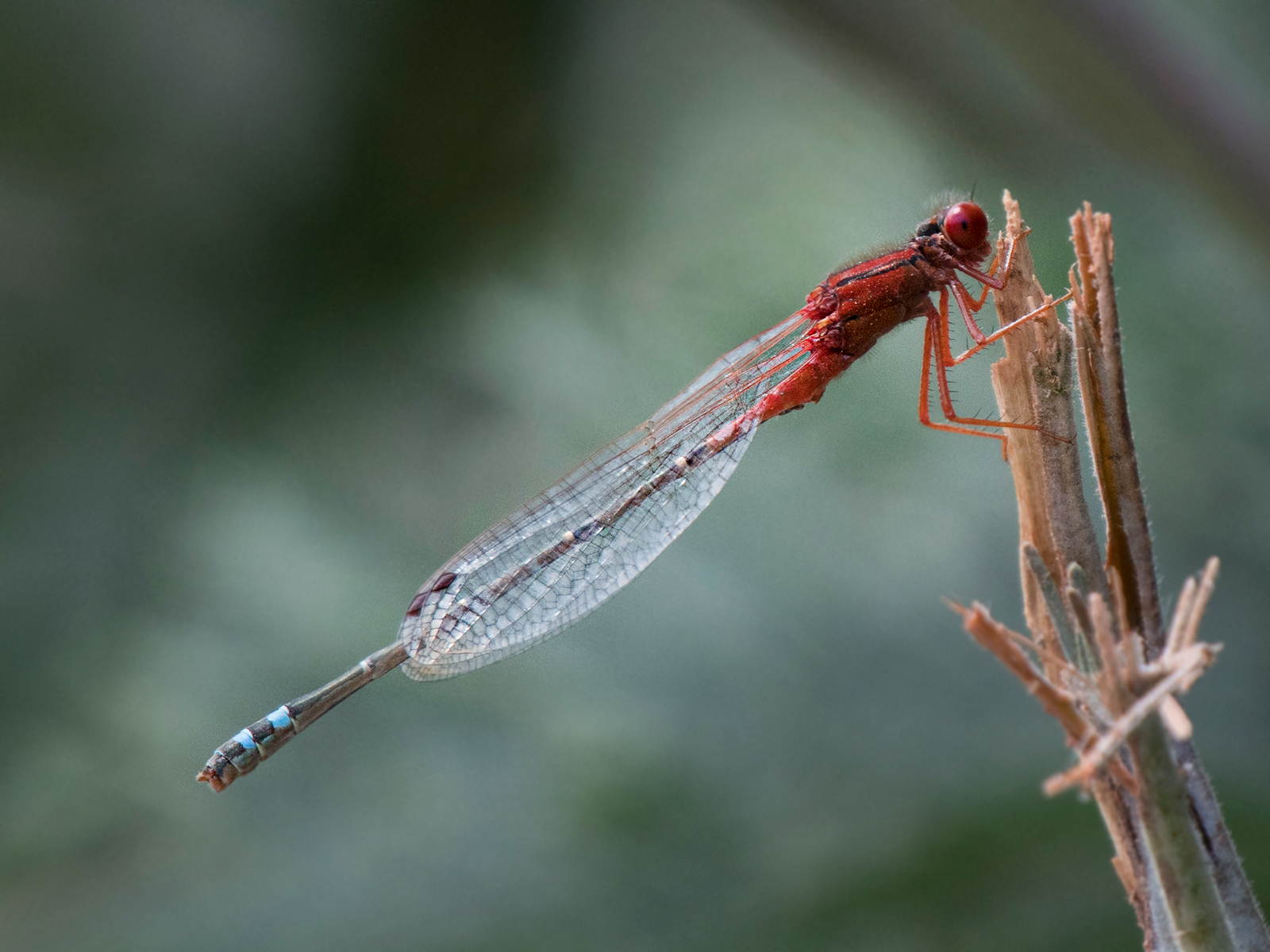
Male

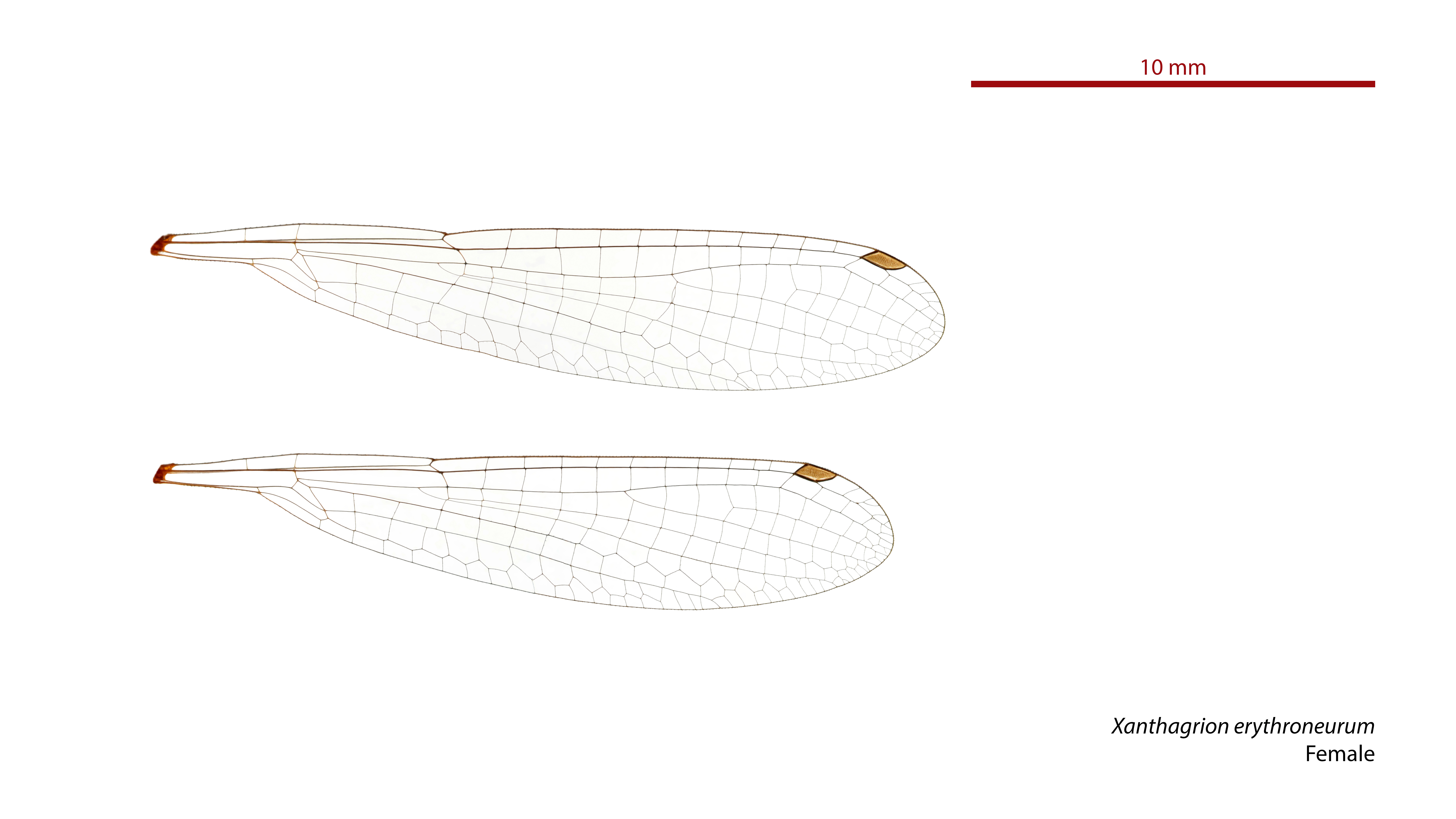
Female wings

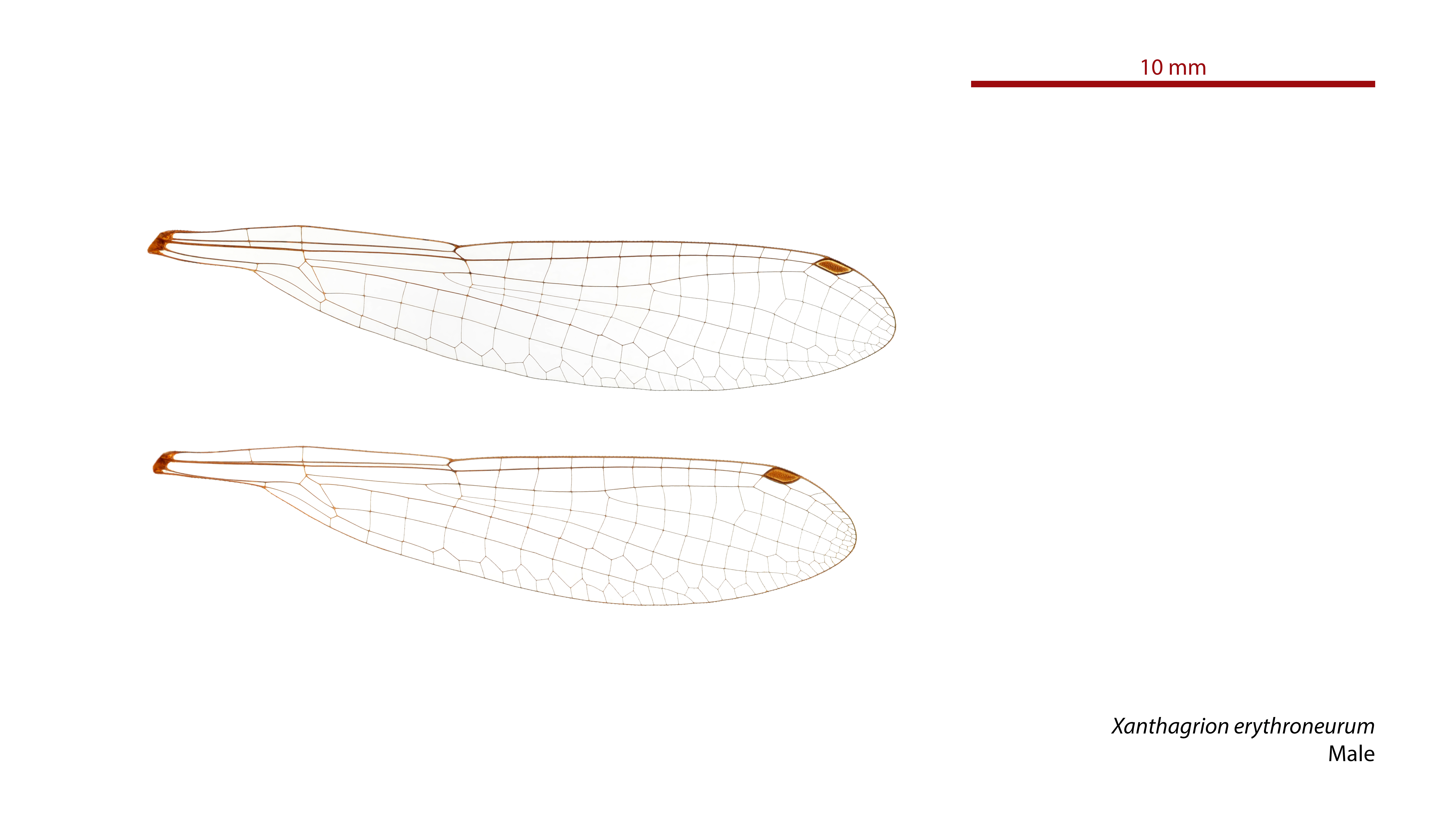
Male wings
