= Xiphiagrion =

Scientific classification
- Kingdom: Animalia
- Phylum: Arthropoda
- Class: Insecta
- Order: Odonata
- Suborder: Zygoptera
- Family: Coenagrionidae
- Genus: Xiphiagrion; Selys, 1876

Type species
- Xiphiagrion cyanomelas Selys, 1876

Genus of insects

Xiphiagrion is a small genus of damselflies of the family Coenagrionidae. It has only two species: Xiphiagrion cyanomelas and Xiphiagrion truncatum.
