= Franciscobasis =

Conservation status
- Critically Endangered (IUCN 3.1)

Scientific classification
- Kingdom: Animalia
- Phylum: Arthropoda
- Clade: Pancrustacea
- Class: Insecta
- Order: Odonata
- Suborder: Zygoptera
- Family: Coenagrionidae
- Genus: Franciscobasis; Machado & Bedê, 2016
- Species: F. franciscoi

Binomial name
- Franciscobasis franciscoi Machado & Bedê, 2016

Genus of damselflies

Franciscobasis is a genus of damselflies in the family Coenagrionidae endemic to the Brazilian Serra da Canastra National Park. The genus only contains one living species, Franciscobasis franciscoi. Originally there were thought to be two, but further study concluded that F. sonia was actually the immature female of F. franciscoi.

Franciscobasis franciscoi is currently listed as Critically Endangered by the IUCN.
