= Hylaeonympha =

Conservation status
- Data Deficient (IUCN 3.1)

Scientific classification
- Kingdom: Animalia
- Phylum: Arthropoda
- Class: Insecta
- Order: Odonata
- Suborder: Zygoptera
- Family: Coenagrionidae
- Genus: Hylaeonympha; Rácenis, 1968
- Species: H. magoi

Binomial name
- Hylaeonympha magoi Rácenis, 1968

Genus of damselflies

Hylaeonympha is a genus of damselfly in the family Coenagrionidae. The only species is Hylaeonympha magoi. It is endemic to Venezuela.
