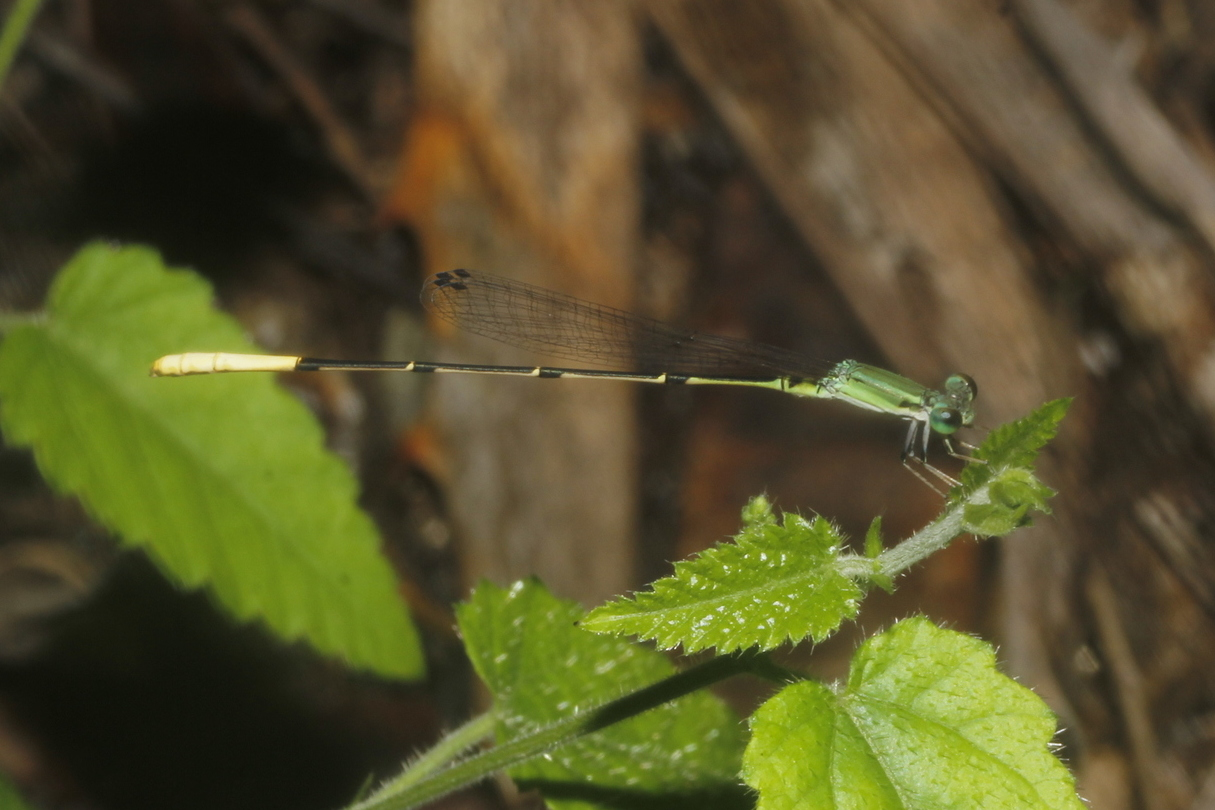
- Leptobasis melinogaster

Scientific classification
- Kingdom: Animalia
- Phylum: Arthropoda
- Clade: Pancrustacea
- Class: Insecta
- Order: Odonata
- Suborder: Zygoptera
- Family: Coenagrionidae
- Genus: Leptobasis; Selys, 1877

Type species
- Agrion croceum Förster, 1906

Synonyms
- Chrysobasis Rácenis, 1959; Hylaeagrion Förster, 1960

= Leptobasis =

Genus of damselflies

Leptobasis is a small genus of damselflies in the family Coenagrionidae. They are commonly known as swampdamsels. The genus is neotropical and one species, L. melinogaster, has been recorded in Texas. They are slender and the females have very long ovipositors.

The genus contains the following species:

- Leptobasis buchholzi (Rácenis, 1959)
- Leptobasis candelaria Alayo, 1968 – Caribbean swampdamsel
- Leptobasis guanacaste Paulson, 2009
- Leptobasis linda Johnson, 2016
- Leptobasis lucifer (Donnelly, 1967) – Lucifer swampdamsel
- Leptobasis mauffrayi Garrison & von Ellenrieder, 2010
- Leptobasis melinogaster González-Soriano, 2002 – cream-tipped swampdamsel
- Leptobasis raineyi (Williamson, 1915)
- Leptobasis vacillans Hagen in Selys, 1877 – red-tipped swampdamsel
