= Oreocnemis phoenix =

Conservation status
- Endangered (IUCN 3.1)

Scientific classification
- Kingdom: Animalia
- Phylum: Arthropoda
- Class: Insecta
- Order: Odonata
- Suborder: Zygoptera
- Family: Platycnemididae
- Genus: Oreocnemis
- Species: O. phoenix

Binomial name
- Oreocnemis phoenix Pinhey, 1971

Species of damselfly

Oreocnemis phoenix, the Mulanje red damsel, is a species of damselfly in the family Platycnemididae. It is endemic to the slopes of Mount Mulanje in Malawi, occurring near montane streams at altitudes of 1,800-2,200 m.

A survey carried out between November 2001 to January 2002 showed that the species was still abundant on the plateau of Mount Mulanje but that it is not present in other highlands in Malawi and adjacent Mozambique. Its habitat is threatened by drainage and habitat destruction due to agriculture, encroachment and over-exploitation of forest, and mining. The IUCN currently classifies it as Endangered.

The Mulanje red damsel is listed as one of the world's 100 most threatened species.
