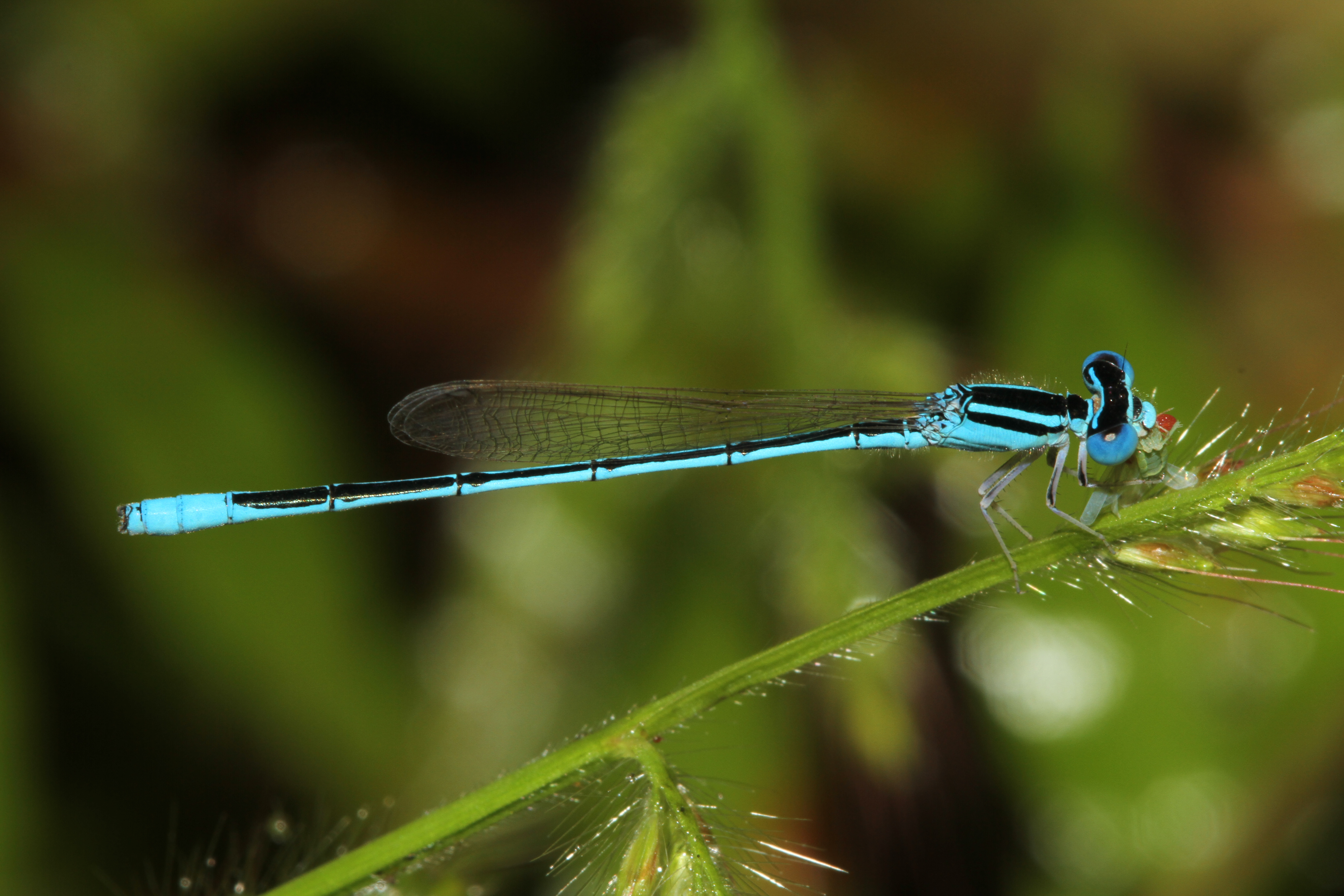
- Male
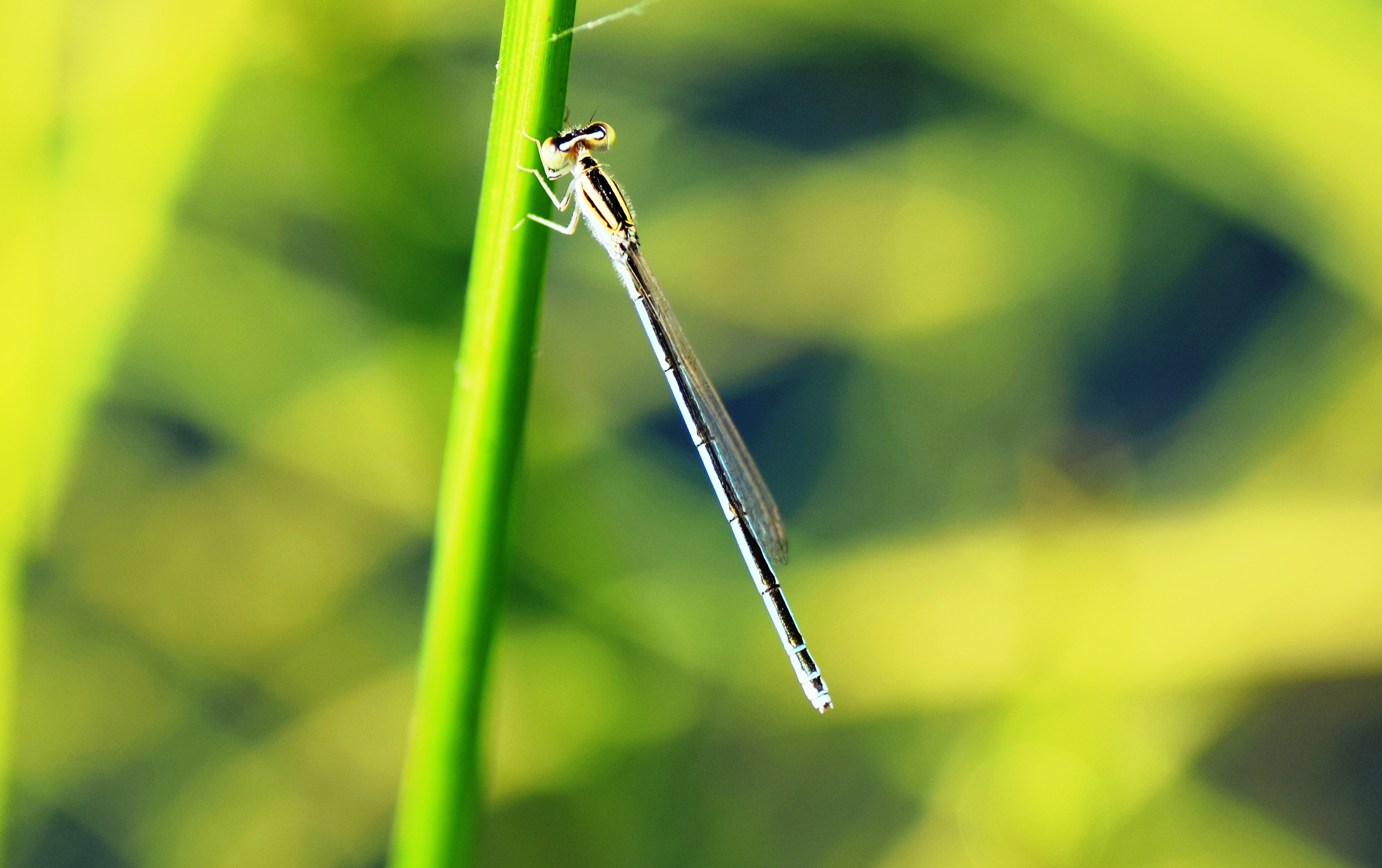
- Female

Conservation status
- Least Concern (IUCN 3.1)

Scientific classification
- Kingdom: Animalia
- Phylum: Arthropoda
- Clade: Pancrustacea
- Class: Insecta
- Order: Odonata
- Suborder: Zygoptera
- Family: Coenagrionidae
- Genus: Amphiallagma; Kennedy, 1920
- Species: A. parvum

Binomial name
- Amphiallagma parvum (Selys, 1876)

Synonyms
- Enallagma parvum Selys, 1876

= Amphiallagma =

Species of damselfly

Amphiallagma parvum, the little blue or azure dartlet, is a species of damselfly in the family Coenagrionidae, the sole species of the genus Amphiallagma. This species can be found in many South Asian countries including India, Sri Lanka, Myanmar, Thailand, Nepal, and probably in Bangladesh.

== Description and habitat ==
It is a small damselfly with sky-blue eyes slightly capped with black. Its thorax is black on dorsum with two very broad antehumeral azure blue stripes bordered with black. The lateral sides are pale blue. Abdomen is pale blue marked with black on dorsum up to segment 7. Segments 8 to 10 are blue; segment 10 has a narrow mid-dorsal stripe. Female is similar to the male; but ground color of thorax and eyes are replaced with greenish yellow. Dorsal mark on abdominal segments is extended to all. Lateral sides of the abdomen is pale blue. Androchrome females also exists with colors similar to the males.

It is commonly found among vegetation along the banks of ponds, lakes, and marshes where it breeds.
