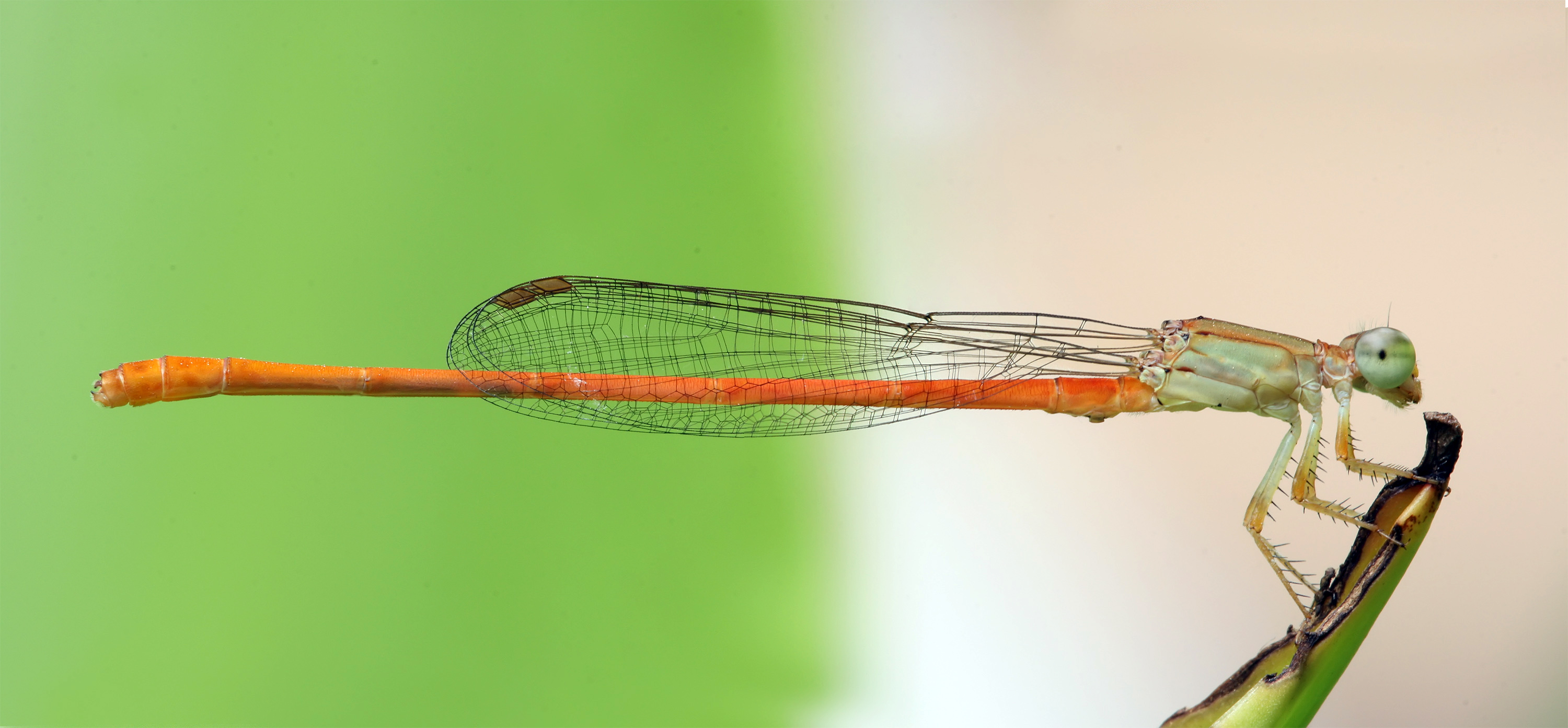
- Male Ceriagrion glabrum

Scientific classification
- Kingdom: Animalia
- Phylum: Arthropoda
- Clade: Pancrustacea
- Class: Insecta
- Order: Odonata
- Suborder: Zygoptera
- Superfamily: Coenagrionoidea
- Family: Coenagrionidae; Kirby, 1890

Diversity
- at least 100 genera
- Distribution of Coenagrionidae

= Coenagrionidae =

Family of insects

Coenagrionidae is a family of damselflies in the superfamily Coenagrionoidea. Commonly known as the pond damselflies or narrow-winged damselflies, they are distributed worldwide and occur in a wide variety of freshwater habitats. With more than 1,300 described species in over 100 genera, Coenagrionidae is the largest family of damselflies.

The family includes many of the most familiar damselflies and, following recent molecular studies, also incorporates several groups that were formerly treated as separate families, including the giant damselflies (Pseudostigmatidae) and the New World Protoneuridae.

== Characteristics ==
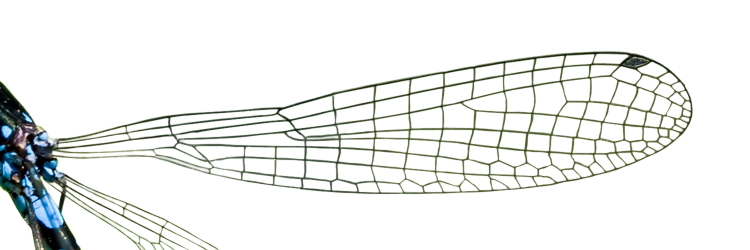
forewing of the variable damselfly (Coenagrion pulchellum)

- Usually have a black pattern
- Ground color may be green, blue, yellow, orange, or purple
- Narrow, stalked, usually colorless and clear wings
- Two antenodal cross veins
- Vein M3 arising nearer to nodus than arculus

Adults are seen around various habitats including ponds and wetlands. The females lay their eggs among living or dead submerged vegetation, and in some species, even crawl about underwater depositing their eggs. The nymphs are usually found in debris or among living or dead submerged plant material.

== Taxonomic history ==
Kirby recognised the family-group name as the subfamily Coenagrioninae in 1890, placing it within the then broadly defined family Agrionidae. The name was subsequently adopted at family rank as Coenagrionidae and became one of the largest families of damselflies.

Traditional classifications divided the family into numerous subfamilies and related families, including the Protoneuridae and Pseudostigmatidae. However, morphological studies found little support for many of these arrangements, and the relationships among coenagrionoid damselflies remained uncertain.

Molecular phylogenetic studies in the early 21st century indicated that Coenagrionidae consisted of two major evolutionary lineages. One lineage included familiar genera such as Coenagrion, Pseudagrion, Agriocnemis, Enallagma and Ischnura, while the second contained groups traditionally treated as separate families or subfamilies, including the Pseudostigmatidae, New World Protoneuridae and Teinobasinae.

A comprehensive molecular study by Dijkstra and colleagues (2014) reorganised the damselfly superfamily Coenagrionoidea into three families: Coenagrionidae, Platycnemididae and Isostictidae. Several groups that had previously been treated as separate families were incorporated into Coenagrionidae, resulting in the modern, broadly defined family.

== Genera ==
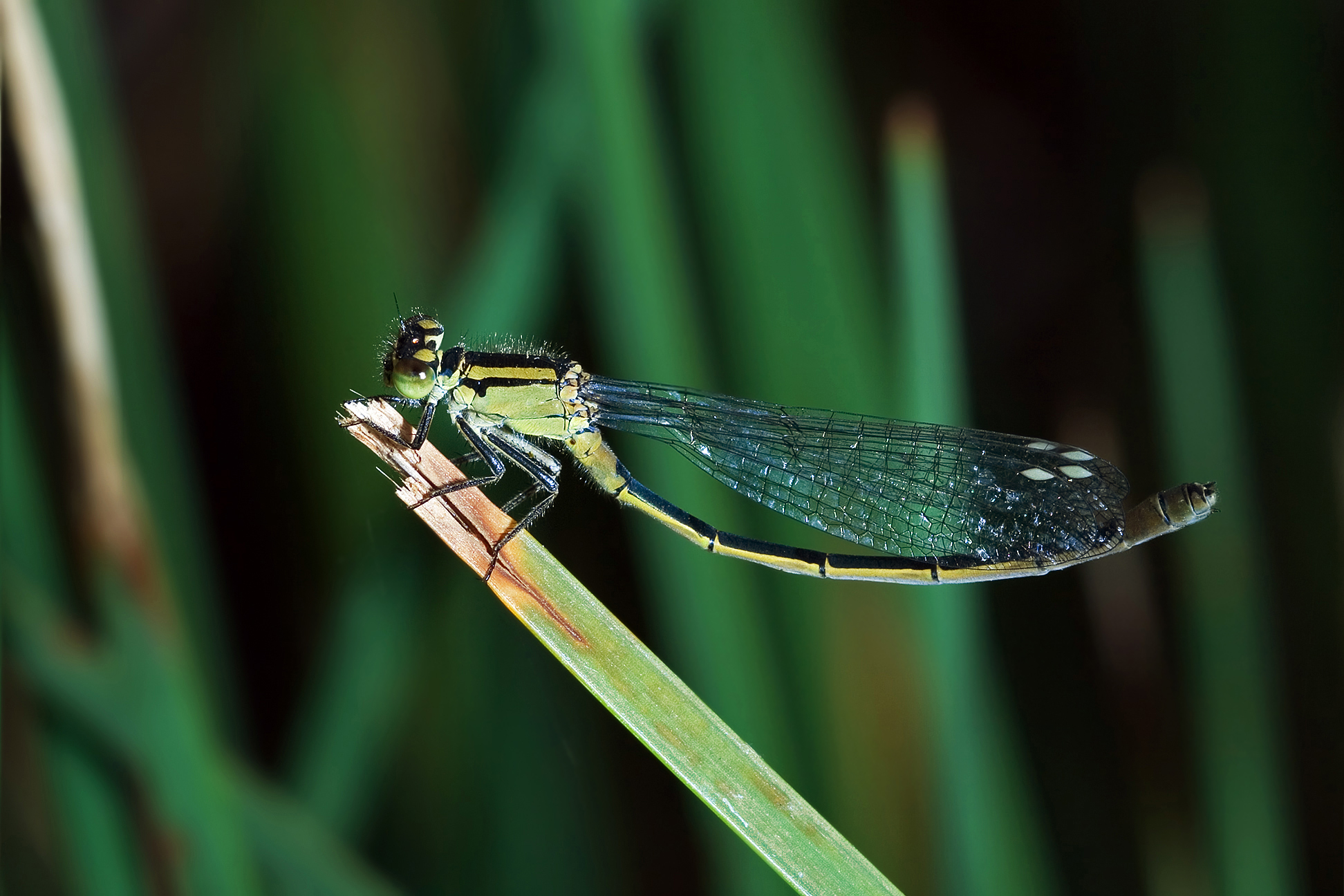
Eastern billabong fly (Austroagrion watsoni, female)

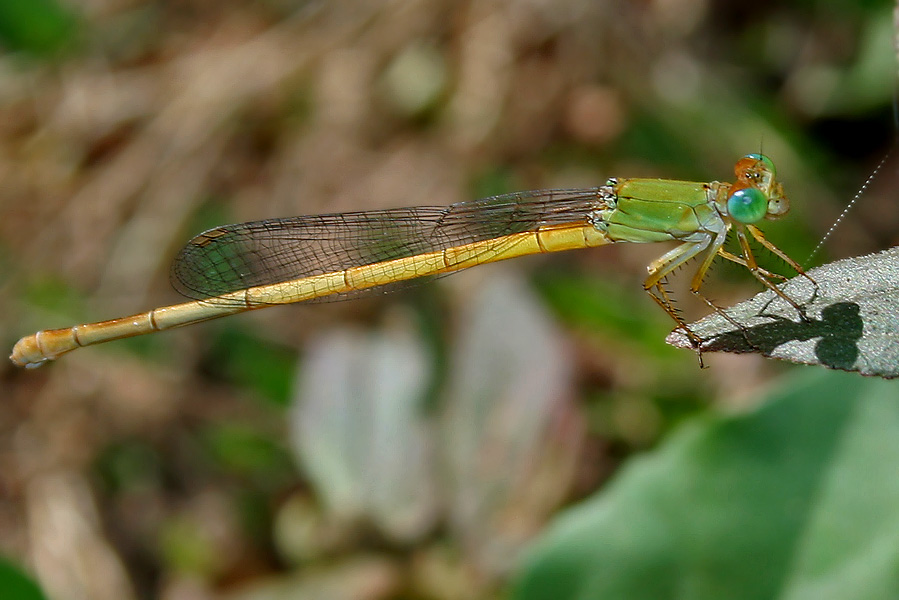
Coromandel marsh dart Ceriagrion coromandelianum

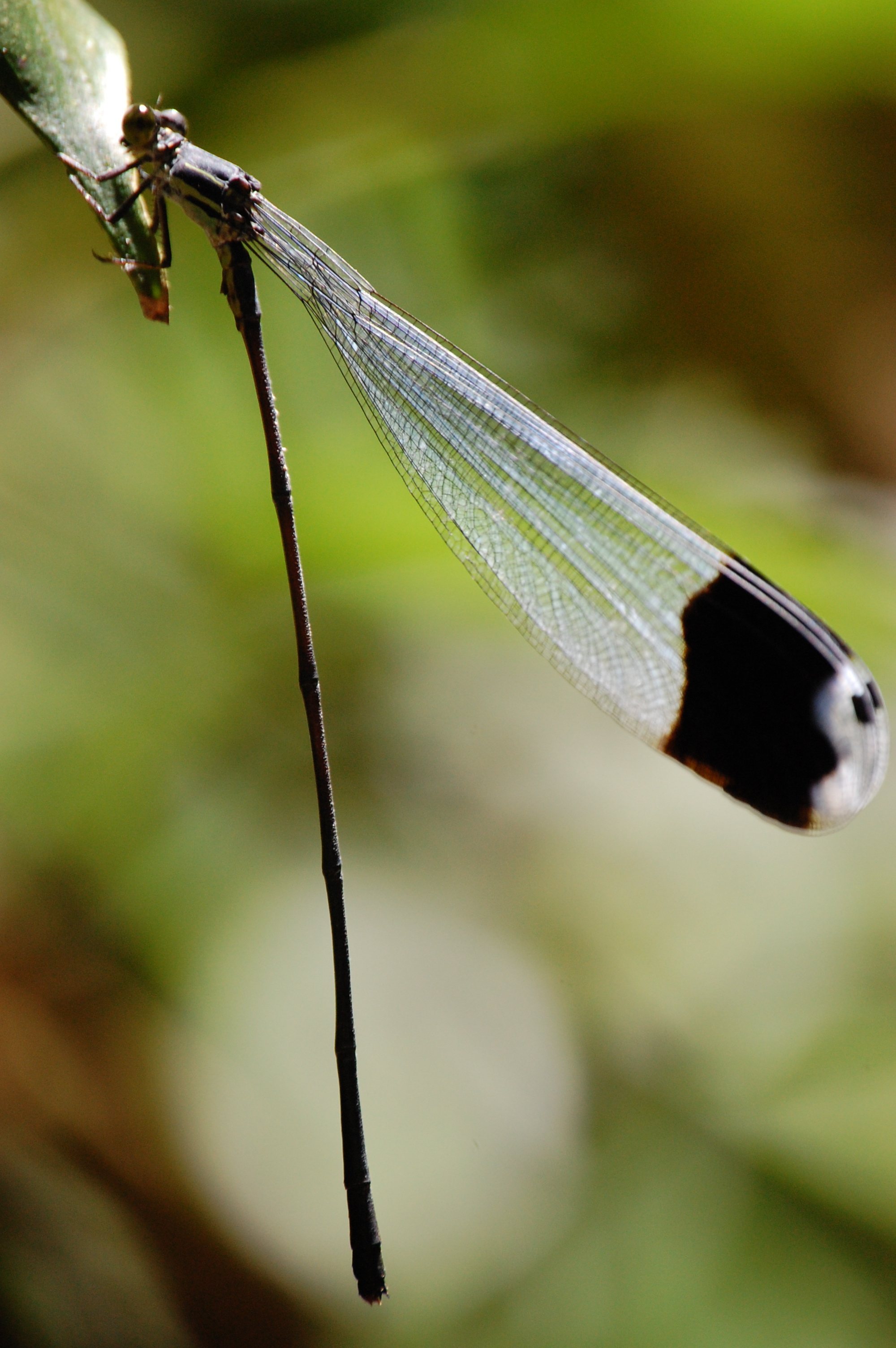
Blue-winged helicopter, Megaloprepus caerulatus, with the largest wingspan of any odonate

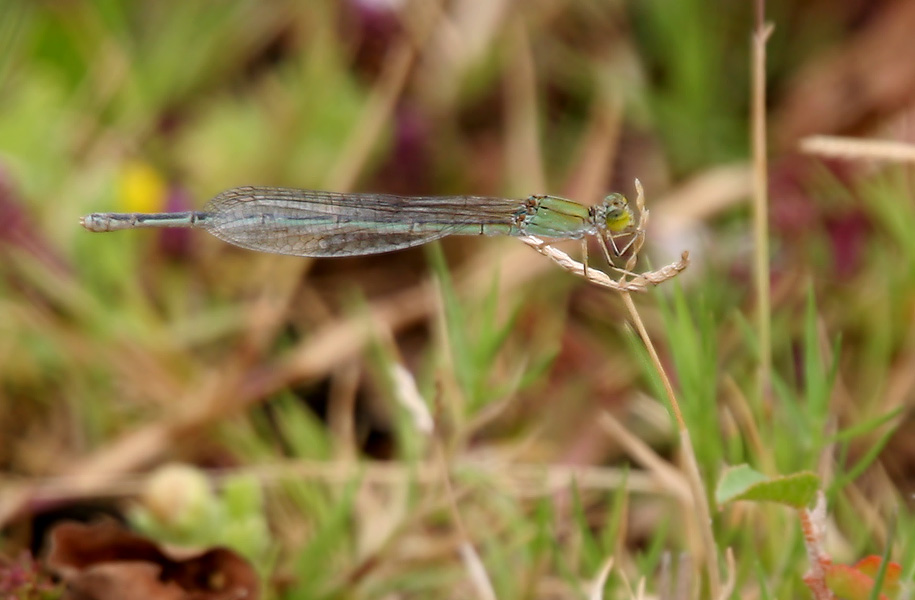
Saffron-faced blue dart Pseudagrion rubriceps

Western forktail damselfly attempting on-the-fly catches. Each repeated in slow motion. The second prey landed, escaping capture. Finally closeup devouring medium sized fly.

Western forktail damselflies interacting.

Common blue damselfly, genus Enallagma, family Coenagrionidae

The following genera are currently placed in Coenagrionidae:

- Acanthagrion Selys, 1876
- Acanthallagma Williamson & Williamson, 1924
- Aceratobasis Kennedy, 1920
- Aciagrion Selys, 1891
- Aeolagrion Williamson, 1917
- Africallagma Kennedy, 1920
- Agriocnemis Selys, 1877
- Amorphostigma Fraser, 1925
- Amphiagrion Selys, 1876
- Amphiallagma Kennedy, 1920
- Amphicnemis Selys, 1863
- Andinagrion Bulla, 1973
- Angelagrion Lencioni, 2008
- Anisagrion Selys, 1876
- Anomisma McLachlan, 1877
- Antiagrion Ris, 1904
- Apanisagrion Kennedy, 1920
- Archibasis Kirby, 1890
- Argentagrion Fraser, 1948
- Argia Rambur, 1842
- Argiocnemis Selys, 1877
- Austroagrion Tillyard, 1913
- Austroallagma Lieftinck, 1953
- Austrocnemis Tillyard, 1913
- Austrocoenagrion Kennedy, 1920
- Azuragrion May, 2002
- Bromeliagrion De Marmels in De Marmels & Garrison, 2005
- Caliagrion Tillyard, 1913
- Calvertagrion St. Quentin, 1960
- Ceriagrion Selys, 1876
- Chromagrion Needham, 1903
- Coenagriocnemis Fraser, 1949
- Coenagrion Kirby, 1890
- Coryphagrion Morton, 1924
- Cyanallagma Kennedy, 1920
- Dactylobasis Pérez-Gutiérrez, 2019
- Denticulobasis Machado, 2009
- Diceratobasis Kennedy, 1920
- Dolonagrion Garrison & von Ellenrieder, 2008
- Enacantha Donnelly & Alayo, 1966
- Enallagma Charpentier, 1840
- Erythiagrion Christie, Medina-Espinoza & Faasen, 2025
- Erythromma Charpentier, 1840
- Fluminagrion Anjos-Santos, Lozano & Costa, 2013
- Franciscagrion Machado & Bedê, 2016
- Franciscobasis Machado & Bedê, 2016
- Hesperagrion Calvert, 1902
- Hivaagrion Hämäläinen & Marinov, 2014
- Homeoura Kennedy, 1920
- Huosoma Guan, Dumont, Yu, Han & Vierstraete, 2013
- Hylaeonympha Rácenis, 1968
- Inpabasis Santos, 1961
- Ischnura Charpentier, 1840
- Junix Rácenis, 1968
- Kuiagrion Mendoza-Penagos & Vilela, 2025
- Leptagrion Selys, 1876
- Leptobasis Selys, 1877
- Leptocnemis Selys, 1886
- Leucobasis Rácenis, 1959
- Luzonobasis Villanueva, 2012
- Mecistogaster Rambur, 1842
- Megalagrion McLachlan, 1883
- Megaloprepus Rambur, 1842
- Melanesobasis Donnelly, 1984
- Mesamphiagrion Kennedy, 1920
- Mesoleptobasis Sjöstedt, 1918
- Metaleptobasis Calvert, 1907
- Microstigma Rambur, 1842
- Minagrion Santos, 1965
- Mortonagrion Fraser, 1920
- Negragrion Muzón & Lozano, 2020
- Nehalennia Selys, 1850
- Neoerythromma Kennedy, 1920
- Nesobasis Selys, 1891
- Nikoulabasis Ferguson, Marinov, Saxton, Rashni & Bybee, 2023
- Oreiallagma von Ellenrieder & Garrison, 2008
- Oreocnemis Pinhey, 1971
- Oxyagrion Selys, 1876
- Oxyallagma Kennedy, 1920
- Pacificagrion Fraser, 1926
- Pandanobasis Villanueva, 2012
- Papuagrion Ris, 1913
- Paracercion Weekers & Dumont, 2004
- Pericnemis Selys, 1863
- Phoenicagrion von Ellenrieder, 2008
- Pinheyagrion May, 2002
- Plagulibasis Lieftinck, 1949
- Platystigma Kennedy, 1920
- Proischnura Kennedy, 1920
- Proneura Selys, 1889
- Protallagma Kennedy, 1920
- Pseudagrion Selys, 1876
- Pseudostigma Selys, 1860
- Pyrrhosoma Charpentier, 1840
- Sangabasis Villanueva, 2012
- Schistolobos von Ellenrieder & Garrison, 2008
- Stenagrion Laidlaw, 1915
- Teinobasis Kirby, 1890
- Telagrion Selys, 1876
- Telebasis Selys, 1865
- Tepuibasis De Marmels, 2007
- Thaumatagrion Lieftinck, 1932
- Tigriagrion Calvert, 1909
- Tuberculobasis Machado, 2009
- Tukanobasis Machado, 2009
- Vanuatubasis Ober & Staniczek, 2009
- Xanthagrion Selys, 1876
- Xanthocnemis Tillyard, 1913
- Xiphiagrion Selys, 1876
- Zoniagrion Kennedy, 1917

== Etymology ==
The family name Coenagrionidae is derived from the type genus Coenagrion, with the standard zoological suffix -idae used for animal families.

The genus name Coenagrion combines the Greek κοινός (koinos, "common") with Agrion, the name of a related genus.

== Gallery ==
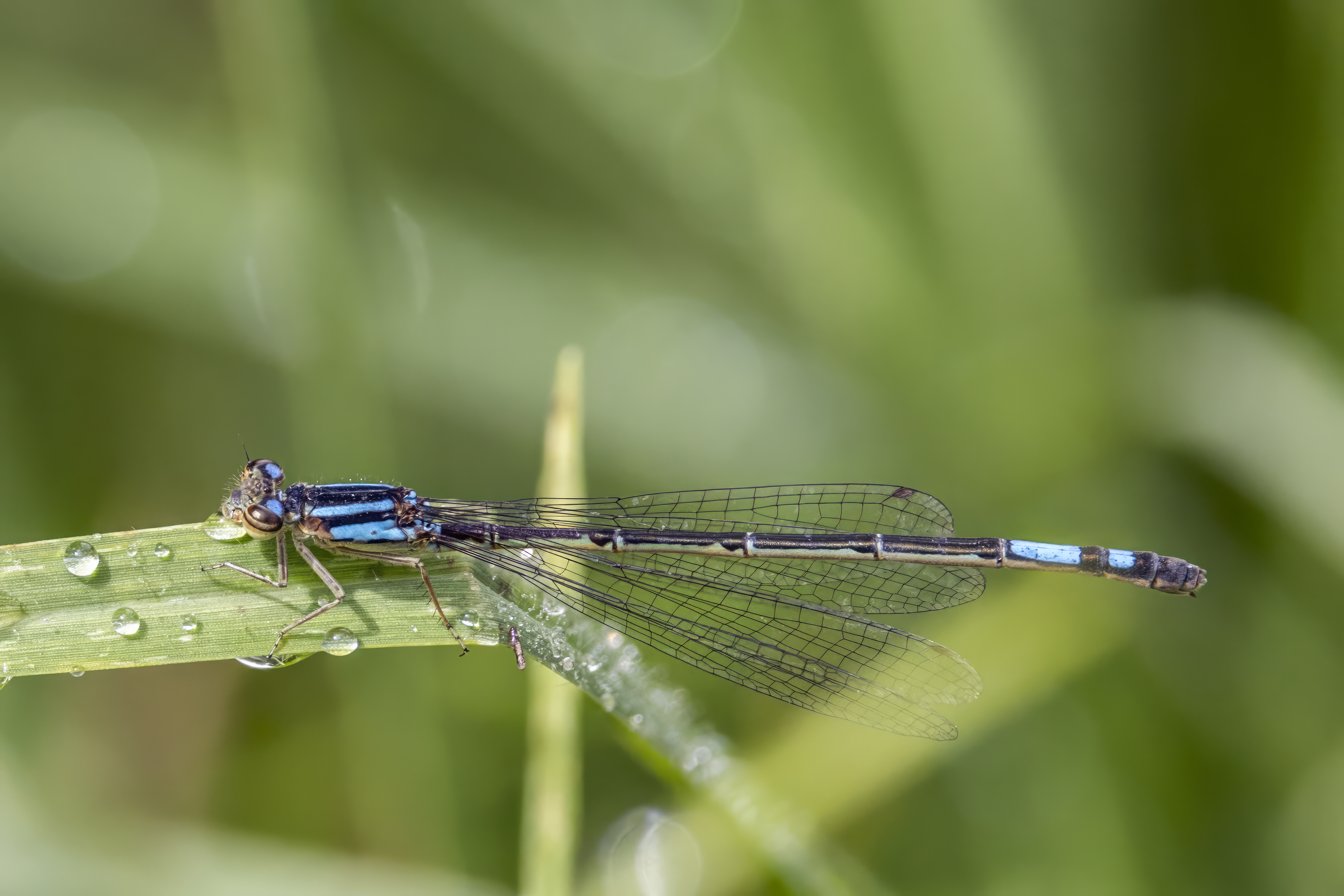
Mesamphiagrion laterale
adult female, Colombia

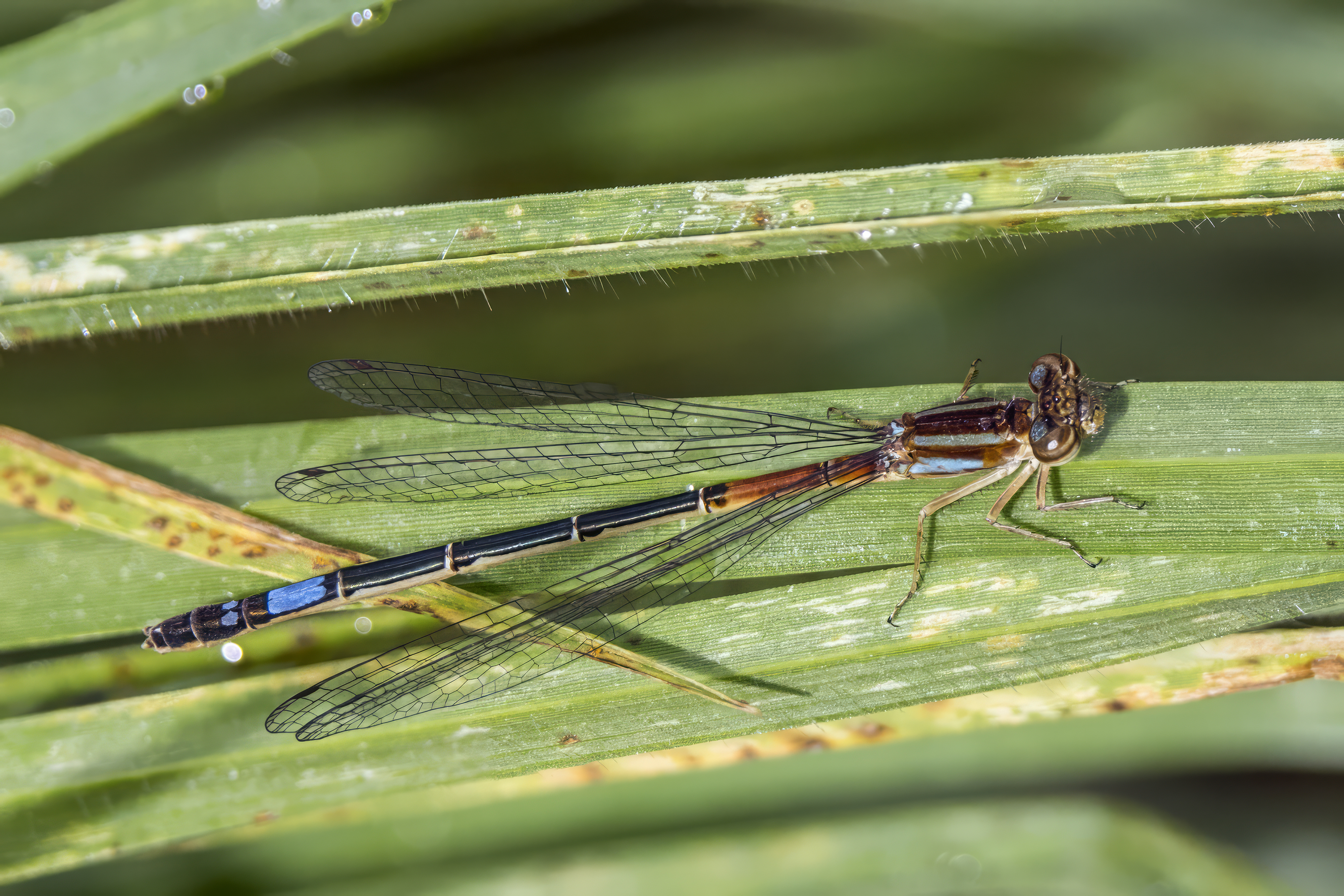
Mesamphiagrion laterale
immature female

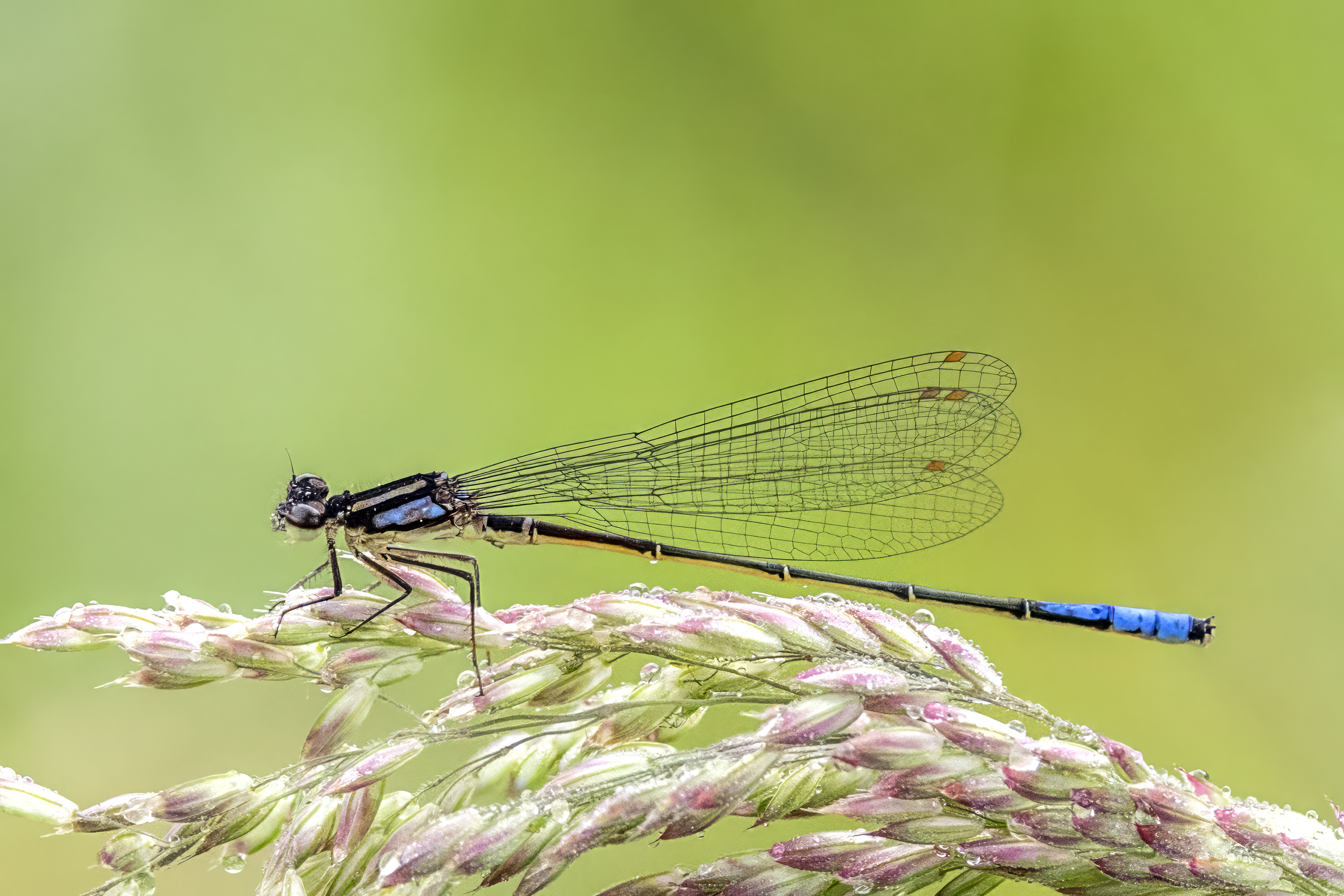
Mesamphiagrion laterale
adult male, Colombia

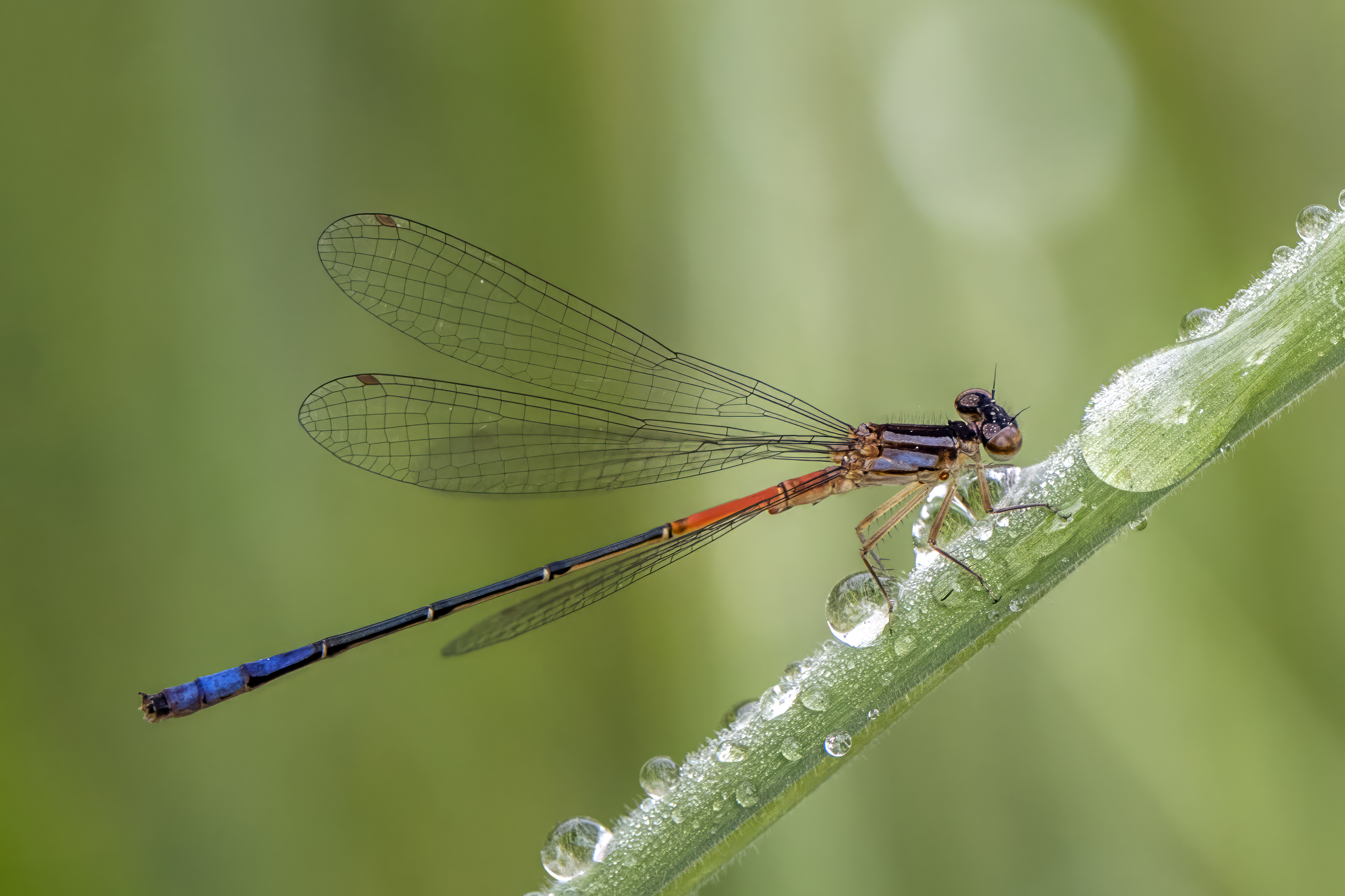
Mesamphiagrion laterale
immature male

== See also ==
- List of damselflies of the world (Coenagrionidae)
