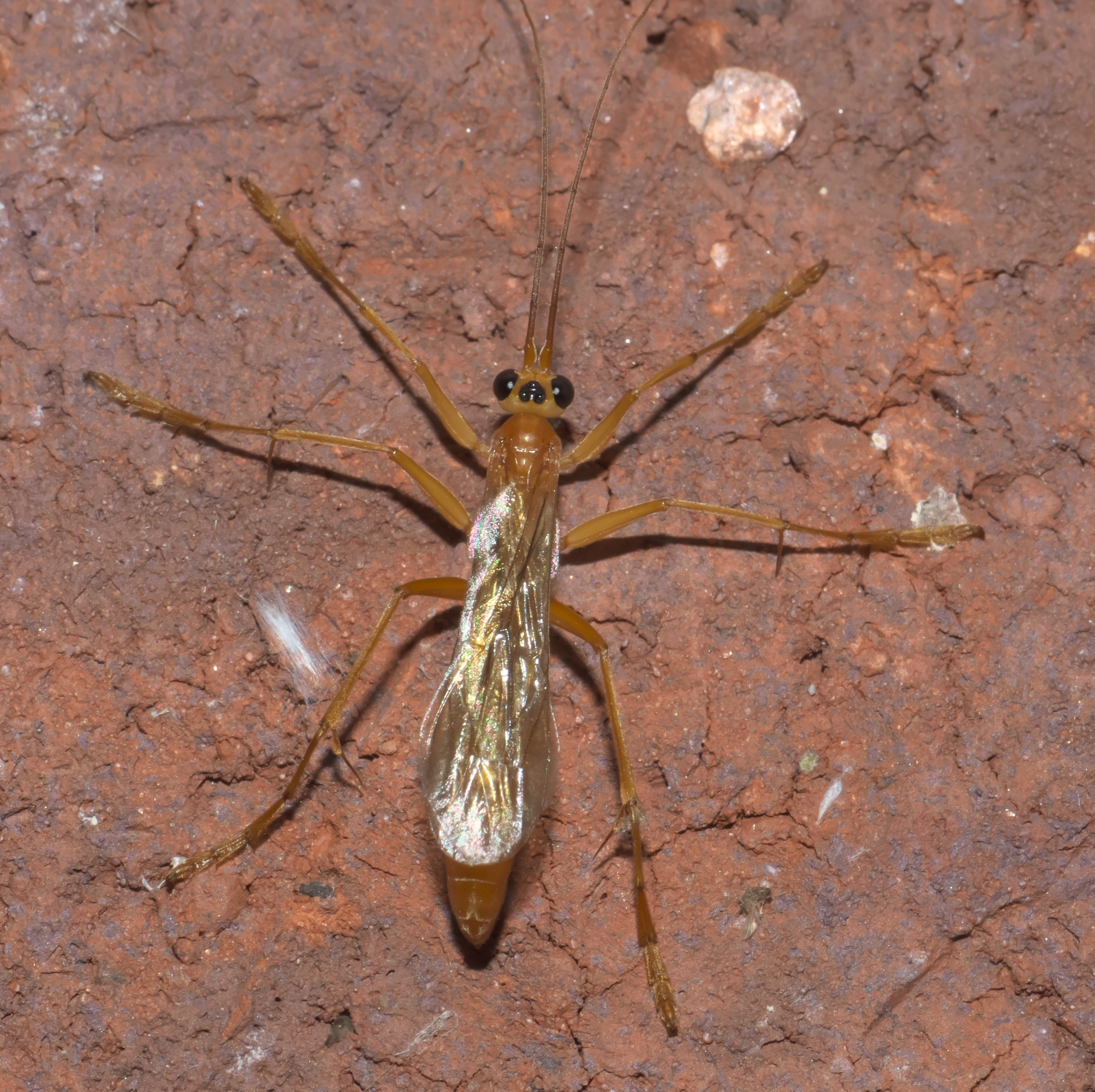
- Rhopalosoma nearcticum, Oklahoma

Scientific classification
- Kingdom: Animalia
- Phylum: Arthropoda
- Class: Insecta
- Order: Hymenoptera
- Family: Rhopalosomatidae
- Genus: Rhopalosoma
- Species: R. nearcticum

Binomial name
- Rhopalosoma nearcticum Brues, 1943

= Rhopalosoma nearcticum =

Species of wasp

Rhopalosoma nearcticum is a species of rhopalosomatid wasp in the family Rhopalosomatidae. It is found in the Americas between the United States and Brazil.
