= Olixon banksii =

Scientific classification
- Kingdom: Animalia
- Phylum: Arthropoda
- Class: Insecta
- Order: Hymenoptera
- Family: Rhopalosomatidae
- Genus: Olixon
- Species: O. banksii

Binomial name
- Olixon banksii (Brues, 1922)

Synonyms
- Nealgoa banksii Brues, 1922

Species of wasp

Olixon banksii is a species of rhopalosomatid wasp in the family Rhopalosomatidae. It occurs in North America.
