= Sinuiju Formation =

Early Cretaceous formation in North Korea

- Stratigraphic range: late Barremian-early Aptian
- Type: Geological formation
- Sub-units: 8 members
- Underlies: Sujin Formation
- Overlies: Precambrian basement
- Thickness: >500 metres (1,600 ft)

Lithology
- Primary: Sandstone, siltstone, mudstone
- Other: Andesite

Location
- Coordinates: 40.1°N 124.4°E
- Approximate paleocoordinates: 43.8°N 125.8°E
- Country: North Korea

Type section
- Named for: Sinuiju city
- Sinuiju Formation (North Korea)

The Sinuiju Formation(신의주층) is a geologic formation in North Korea.

== Geology ==
It overlies the Precambrian basement with uncomformity. The formation is consisted with eight different members, but So and Won (2021) suggested it has only four members.

The first member consists of purple-brown siltstone and well-graded sandstone, and mudstone containing fossils. The second member overlies the first member with comformity, and consists of andesite and tuffaceous sandstone. The third member overlies the second member with comformity, and consists of greyish-green sandstone, grey and black mudstones and stitstone. It also yields diverse fossils, with 200-300 meters. The fourth member contains volcanic sandstone, siltstone, claystone, and shale in its lower section. Members five through eight lack exposed outcrops and are composed primarily of andesite, along with tuffaceous sandstone and siltstone.

The age of the Sinuiju Formation was previously thought to be Late Jurassic to earliest Cretaceous, but based on fossil records showing overlapping taxa with the Lower Cretaceous Yixian Formation, it is more likely that the formation actually represents Barremian-Aptian in age based on insect and bivalve fossils. The Sinuiju Formation is suggested to be deposited in fluvial-lacustrine setting.

== Fossil content ==
Fossil records from the Sinuiju Formation is known with various types of vertebrates, invertebrates and plants.

Plant fossil assemblages from the Sinuiju Formation indicates warm to temperate regions. It is characterized by abundant ginkgoaleans, czekanowskialeans and conifers, but no cycadophytes have been found.

=== Plants ===
Plants from the Sinuiju Formation
Genus	Species	Material	Notes	Member	Images
Equisetites	E. ushimuraensis		Horsetail		
Cladophlebis	C. denticulata		Ferns		
Coniopteris	C. burejensis; C. hymenophylloides		Ferns		
Ruffordia	R. goepperti		Ferns		
Sphenopteris	S. nitidula		Specific group unknown		
Ginkgo	G. sibirica		Ginkgoales gymnosperms		
Ginkgoites	G. jampolensis		Ginkgoales gymnosperms		
Czekanowskia	C. rigida		Czekanowskiales gymnosperm		
Podozamites	P. lanceolatus		Conifer		

=== Fish ===
Fish from the Sinuiju Formation
Genus	Species	Material	Notes	Member	Images
Lycoptera	L. davidii		Third Member		
Acipenseriformes	Indeterminate				

=== Amphibians ===
Amphibians from the Sinuiju Formation
Genus	Species	Material	Notes	Member	Images
Anura	Anura indet.	Partial postcranial skeleton	Possibly related to Liaobatrachus grabaui	Third Member	

=== Pterosaurs ===
Pterosaurs from the Sinuiju Formation
Genus	Species	Material	Notes	Member	Images
Jeholopterus	J. cf. ningchengensis	Specimen CKGP 19960828, formerly PS198922		Third Member	
Pterosauria	Indeterminate	Specimen PS199921		Third Member	

=== Dinosaurs ===
Dinosaurs from the Sinuiju Formation
Genus	Species	Material	Notes	Member	Images
Dinosauria	Indeterminate	A single tooth		Third Member	
Confuciusornithidae	Indeterminate	Partial forelimb bones supporting the wings; Skull and partial wing with feather impressions	The partial forelimb described in 2009 represents the fossil informally named as "Proornis coreae"	Third Member	
Enantiornithes	Indeterminate	Left and right feet with metatarsals			
Ornithurae	Indeterminate	A 5 cm (2.0 in) long tibia, partial wing digit and 3.5 cm (1.4 in) long pygostyle			

=== Mammals ===
Mammals from the Sinuiju Formation
Genus	Species	Material	Notes	Member	Images
Multituberculata	Indeterminate	Partial postcranial skeleton		Lowermost part of the fourth member	

=== Insects ===
==== Odonata ====
Dragonflies from the Sinuiju Formation
Genus	Species	Material	Notes	Member	Images
Stenophlebia	S. ryonsangensis		Stenophlebiidae	Third Member	
Phyonganpodagrion	P. ryonsangae		Megapodagrionidae	Third Member	

==== Ephemeroptera ====
Mayflies from the Sinuiju Formation
Genus	Species	Material	Notes	Member	Images
Ephemeropsis	E. trisetalis			Third Member	

==== Orthoptera ====
Orthopterans from the Sinuiju Formation
Genus	Species	Material	Notes	Member	Images
Sinuijus	S. baektoensis		Prophalangopsidae orthopteran	Third Member	
Pharangia	P. sibirica		Prophalangopsidae orthopteran	Third Member	

==== Dictyoptera ====
Cockroaches from the Sinuiju Formation
Genus	Species	Material	Notes	Member	Images
Sinuijublatta	S. sinuijuensa		Caloblattinidae	Third Member	
Paekthoblatta	P. coreanica		Raphidiomimidae	Third Member	
Habroblattula	H. drepanoides		Blattulidae	Third Member	
Perlucipecta	P. aurea		Mesoblattinidae	Third Member	
Spinaeblattina	S. baekthoensis		Mesoblattinidae	Third Member	

==== Hemiptera ====
Hemipterans from the Sinuiju Formation
Genus	Species	Material	Notes	Member	Images
Stellularis	S. sinuijuensis		Procercopidae planthopper	Third Member	

==== Hymenoptera ====
Hymenopterans from the Sinuiju Formation
Genus	Species	Material	Notes	Member	Images
Angarosphex	A. baektoensus		Angarosphecidae wasp	Third Member	
Pompilopterus	P. ryonsangensis		Angarosphecidae wasp	Third Member	
Karataus	K. ryonsangensis		Ephialtitidae wasp	Third Member	
Sinuijuhelorus	S. baektoensis		Heloridae wasp	Third Member	

==== Raphidioptera ====
Snakeflies from the Sinuiju Formation
Genus	Species	Material	Notes	Member	Images
Mesoraphidia	M. ryonsangiensis; M. baekthoensis		Mesoraphidiidae	Third Member	

==== Neuroptera ====
Neuropterans from the Sinuiju Formation
Genus	Species	Material	Notes	Member	Images
Sinuijumantispa	S. ryonsangiensis		Mantispidae	Third Member	

==== Coleoptera ====
Beetles from the Sinuiju Formation
Genus	Species	Material	Notes	Member	Images
Zygadenia	Z. liui		Family unknown	Third Member	

==== Mecoptera ====
Mecopterans from the Sinuiju Formation
Genus	Species	Material	Notes	Member	Images
Paekthobittacus	P. sinuijuensis		Bittacidae hangingfly	Third Member	

=== Conchostracans ===
Conchostracans from the Sinuiju Formation
Genus	Species	Material	Notes	Member	Images
Eosestheria	E. middendorfii; E. sp.				
Yanjiestheria	Y. kyongsangensis				

=== Ostracods ===
Ostracods from the Sinuiju Formation
Genus	Species	Material	Notes	Member	Images
Cypridea	C. concina; C. ritimensis				
Dariwinula	D. tubiformis				
Ziziphocypris	Z. costata				

=== Molluscs ===
Molluscs from the Sinuiju Formation
Genus	Species	Material	Notes	Member	Images
Arguniella	A. yanshanensis; A. lingyuanensis			Third Member	
Sphaerium	S. anderssoni			Third Member	
Viviparus	V. sp.		Viviparidae gastropod		
Valvata	V. sp.		Valvatidae gastropod		

== See also ==
- List of dinosaur-bearing rock formations
  - List of stratigraphic units with few dinosaur genera
