= Angarosphecidae =

Angarosphecidae Temporal range: Valanginian–Ypresian

Scientific classification
- Kingdom: Animalia
- Phylum: Arthropoda
- Class: Insecta
- Order: Hymenoptera
- Infraorder: Aculeata
- Superfamily: Apoidea
- Family: †Angarosphecidae; Rasnitsyn 1975

Genera
- See text

Extinct family of insects

Angarosphecidae is an extinct family of Mesozoic and early Cenozoic wasps in the superfamily Apoidea.

== Taxonomy ==
- Angarosphex Rasnitsyn, 1975 (synonyms Calobaissodes Zhang, 1992, Mataeosphex Zhang, 1985, Palaeapis Hong, 1984, Shandongodes Zhang, 1985
  - An. alethes Rosa & Melo, 2023 - Cenomanian Burmese amber, Myanmar
  - An. baektoensus Jon et al., 2019 - Barremian/Aptian, Sinuiju Formation, North Korea
  - An. beiboziensis Hong, 1984 - Aptian Laiyang Formation, China
  - An. bleachi Rasnitsyn & Jarzembowski, 1998 - Hauterivian, Clockhouse Brickworks, Weald Clay, United Kingdom
  - An. consensus Rasnitsyn & Jarzembowski, 1998 - Hauterivian, Clockhouse Brickworks, Weald Clay, United Kingdom
  - An. goldringi Jarzembowski, 1991 - Hauterivian, Auclaye Brickworks, Weald Clay, United Kingdom
  - An. lithodes Zhang, 1985 - Aptian Laiyang Formation, Yixian Formation, China
  - An. lithographicus Rasnitsyn & Ansorge, 2000 - Hauterivian/Barremian La Pedrera de Rúbies Formation, Spain
  - An. magnus Darling, 1990 - Barremian Crato Formation, Brazil
  - An. myrmicopterus Rasnitsyn, 1975 - Aptian Baissa, Zaza Formation, Russia
  - An. niger Rasnitsyn, 1990 - Aptian, Turga Formation, Russia
  - An. pallidus Rasnitsyn, 1986 - Aptian Gurvan-Eren Formation, Mongolia
  - An. parvus Darling, 1990 - Barremian Crato Formation, Brazil
  - An. penyalveri Rasnitsyn & Martínez-Delclòs, 2000 - Hauterivian/Barremian La Pedrera de Rúbies Formation, Spain
  - An. ryonsangiensis Ri et al., 2022 - Barremian/Aptian, Sinuiju Formation, North Korea
  - An. saxosus Zhang et al., 2018 - Aptian, Huangbanjigou, Yixian Formation, China
  - An. strigosus Zhang, 1992 - Aptian Laiyang Formation, China
  - An. venulosus Zhang, 1985 - Aptian Laiyang Formation, China
- Archisphex Evans, 1969 (synonyms Cretosphex Rasnitsyn, 1975)
  - Ar. boothi Jarzembowski, 1991
  - Ar. catalunicus Ansorge, 1993
  - Ar. crowsoni Evans, 1969
  - Ar. curvus Rasnitsyn & Jarzembowski, 1998
  - Ar. incertus Rasnitsyn, 1975
  - Ar. proximus Rasnitsyn & Jarzembowski, 1998
- Baissodes Rasnitsyn, 1975 Weald Clay, United Kingdom, Hauterivian Yixian Formation, China, Aptian Gurvan-Eren Formation, Mongolia, Aptian Zaza Formation, Russia, Aptian
  - B. grabaui Ren, 1995
  - B. longus Rasnitsyn, 1986
  - B. magnus Rasnitsyn, 1975
  - B. robustus Rasnitsyn, 1975
- Cretobestiola Pulawski & Rasnitsyn, 2000 (synonym Bestiola Pulawski & Rasnitsyn, 1999) La Pedrera de Rúbies Formation, Spain, Barremian Crato Formation, Brazil, Aptian, Dzun-Bain Formation, Mongolia, Aptian Zaza Formation, Argun Formation, Russia, Aptian
  - Cb. communis Pulawski & Rasnitsyn, 1999
  - Cb. hispanica Martínez-Delclòs & Rasnitsyn, 1999
  - Cb. subpetiolata Pulawski & Rasnitsyn, 1999
  - Cb. tenuipes Pulawski & Rasnitsyn, 1999
- Cretosphecium Pulawski & Rasnitsyn, 2000
  - Cs. lobatum Pulawski & Rasnitsyn, 2000 - Aptian, Dzun-Bain Formation, Mongolia
  - Cs. triste Pulawski & Rasnitsyn, 2000 - Aptian, Dzun-Bain Formation, Mongolia
- Eosphecium Pulawski & Rasnitsyn, 2000
  - Eo. naumanni Brothers & Archibald, 2000 - Ypresian, Coldwater Beds, Eocene Okanagan Highlands, Canada
- Eubaissodes Zhang, 1992
  - Eu. completus Zhang, 1992 - Aptian, Laiyang Formation, China
- Ilerdosphex Rasnitsyn, 2000
  - I. wenzae Rasnitsyn, 2000 - Barremian, La Pedrera de Rúbies Formation, Spain
- Mesorhopalosoma Darling, 1990
  - Me. cearae Darling, 1990 - Aptian, Crato Formation, Brazil
- Montsecosphex Rasnitsyn & Martínez-Delclòs, 2000
  - Mo. jarzembowskii Rasnitsyn & Martínez-Delclòs, 2000 - Barremian, La Pedrera de Rúbies Formation, Spain
- Oryctobaissodes Rasnitsyn, 1975
  - O. armatus Rasnitsyn, 1975 - Aptian, Zaza Formation, Russia,
- Paleorhopalosoma Nel et al., 2010
  - Pa. menatensis Nel et al., 2010 - Paleocene, Menat Formation, France
- Pompilopterus Rasnitsyn, 1975 Weald Clay, United Kingdom, Hauterivian/Barremian La Pedrera de Rúbies Formation, Spain, Barremian, Zaza Formation, Russia, Aptian, Sinuiju Formation, North Korea, Aptian
  - Po. ciliatus Rasnitsyn, 1975
  - Po. corpus Rasnitsyn & Jarzembowski, 1998
  - Po. difficilis Rasnitsyn & Jarzembowski, 1998
  - Po. keymerensis Rasnitsyn & Jarzembowski, 1998
  - Po. leei Rasnitsyn & Jarzembowski, 1998
  - Po. montsecensis Rasnitsyn, 2000
  - Po. noguerensis Rasnitsyn & Martínez-Delclòs, 2000
  - Po. ryonsangensis So & Won, 2021
  - Po. sinuijuensis Ri et al., 2022
  - Po. wimbledoni Rasnitsyn & Jarzembowski, 1998
  - Po. worssami Rasnitsyn & Jarzembowski, 1998
- Trichobaissodes Rasnitsyn, 1975
  - T. antennatus Rasnitsyn, 1975 - Aptian, Zaza Formation, Russia
- Vitimosphex Rasnitsyn, 1975
  - V. incompletus Rasnitsyn, 1975 - Aptian, Zaza Formation, Russia
  - V. vividus Zhang et al., 2018 - Yixian Formation, China

Undescribed specimens are known from the Cenomanian aged Burmese amber of Myanmar, and several of the Eocene Okanagan Highlands sites. Fossils identified as Eosphecium sp. have been reported from the Driftwood shales, Tranquille Formation, and Klondike Mountain Formation. Additional angarosphecid specimens are reported from the Tranquille and Republic sites plus the Allenby Formation that are not Eosphecium. Burmasphex Melo and Rosa (2018) and Decasphex Zheng et al (2020), originally assigned to this family, were subsequently moved to the separate apoid family Burmasphecidae.
