= Eorhopalosoma =

Eorhopalosoma Temporal range: Cenomanian

Scientific classification
- Kingdom: Animalia
- Phylum: Arthropoda
- Class: Insecta
- Order: Hymenoptera
- Family: Rhopalosomatidae
- Genus: †Eorhopalosoma; Engel, 2008

Species
- See text

Extinct genus of insects

Eorhopalosoma is an extinct genus of wasps in family Rhopalosomatidae. It was found in Burmese amber

== Taxonomy ==
The genus contains the following species:

- Eorhopalosoma gorgyra Engel, 2008
- Eorhopalosoma lohrmanni Boudinot and Dungey, 2020
