= Liosphex =

Scientific classification
- Domain: Eukaryota
- Kingdom: Animalia
- Phylum: Arthropoda
- Class: Insecta
- Order: Hymenoptera
- Family: Rhopalosomatidae
- Genus: Liosphex; Townes, 1977

Type species
- Liosphex varius Townes, 1977

Species
- see text

Genus of wasps

Liosphex is a genus of wasps in family Rhopalosomatidae. Members of this family are parasitic of crickets.

== Taxonomy ==
The genus contains the following species:

- Liosphex achuar Lohrmann, 2010
- Liosphex atratus Lohrmann, 2010
- Liosphex boreus Lohrmann, 2010
- Liosphex bribri Lohrmann, 2010
- Liosphex darien Lohrmann, 2010
- Liosphex guanabara Lohrmann, 2010
- Liosphex guarani Lohrmann, 2010
- Liosphex longicornis Lohrmann, 2010
- Liosphex maleku Lohrmann, 2010
- Liosphex micropterus Lohrmann, 2010
- Liosphex quechua Lohrmann, 2010
- Liosphex trichopleurum Townes, 1977
- Liosphex tupi Lohrmann, 2010
- Liosphex varius Townes, 1977
