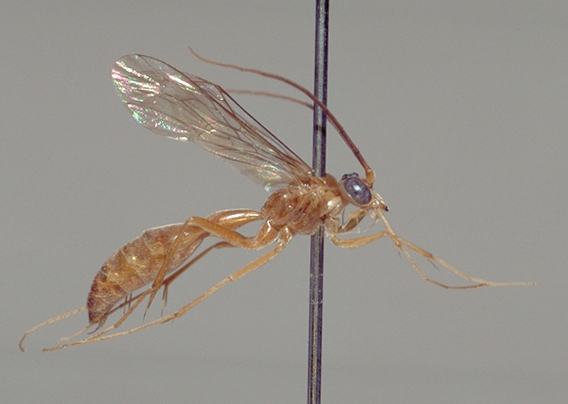
- Rhopalosoma sp.

Scientific classification
- Domain: Eukaryota
- Kingdom: Animalia
- Phylum: Arthropoda
- Class: Insecta
- Order: Hymenoptera
- Family: Rhopalosomatidae
- Genus: Rhopalosoma; Cresson, 1865

Type species
- Rhopalosoma poeyii Cresson, 1865

Species
- see text.

= Rhopalosoma =

Genus of wasps

Rhopalosoma is a genus of wasps in family Rhopalosomatidae. Members of this family are parasitic of crickets.

== Taxonomy ==
The genus contains the following species:

- Rhopalosoma alvarengai Townes, 1977
- Rhopalosoma angulare Townes, 1977
- Rhopalosoma bahianum Schulz, 1906
- Rhopalosoma bolivianum Brues, 1943
- Rhopalosoma breelandi Townes, 1977
- Rhopalosoma guianense Schulz, 1906
- Rhopalosoma haitiense Townes, 1977
- Rhopalosoma hispaniola Lohrmann, 2019
- Rhopalosoma impar Townes, 1977
- Rhopalosoma isopus Townes, 1977
- Rhopalosoma lanceolatum Townes, 1977
- Rhopalosoma minus Townes, 1977
- Rhopalosoma missionicum Ogloblin, 1951
- Rhopalosoma nearcticum Brues, 1943
- Rhopalosoma obliquum Townes, 1977
- Rhopalosoma poeyi Cresson, 1865
- Rhopalosoma scaposum Townes, 1977
- Rhopalosoma simile Brues, 1943
