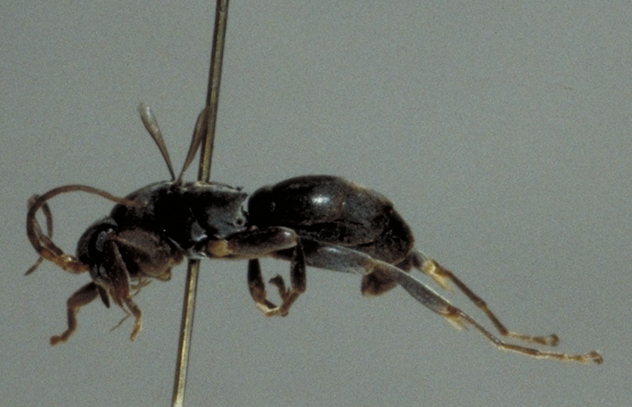
- Olixon spec

Scientific classification
- Domain: Eukaryota
- Kingdom: Animalia
- Phylum: Arthropoda
- Class: Insecta
- Order: Hymenoptera
- Family: Rhopalosomatidae
- Genus: Olixon; Cameron, 1887

Type species
- Olixon testaceum Cameron, 1887

Species
- see text

= Olixon =

Genus of wasps

Olixon is a genus of wasps in family Rhopalosomatidae. Members of this family are parasitic of crickets.

== Taxonomy ==
The genus contains the following species:

- Olixon abrahami Krogmann, Austin & Naumann, 2009
- Olixon atlanticum Fernandez & Sarmiento-M, 2002
- Olixon australiae (Perkins, 1908)
- Olixon banksii (Brues, 1922)
- Olixon bicolor Roig Alsina & Martínez, 2010
- Olixon danggari Krogmann, Austin & Naumann, 2009
- Olixon dentatum (Cameron, 1904)
- Olixon ferrugineum Krogmann, Austin & Naumann, 2009
- Olixon flavibase Townes, 1977
- Olixon guyim Krogmann, Austin & Naumann, 2009
- Olixon harveyi Krogmann, Austin & Naumann, 2009
- Olixon helgae Krogmann, Austin & Naumann, 2009
- Olixon jandakotae Krogmann, Austin & Naumann, 2009
- Olixon jawoyn Krogmann, Austin & Naumann, 2009
- Olixon jenningsi Krogmann, Austin & Naumann, 2009
- Olixon kakadui Krogmann, Austin & Naumann, 2009
- Olixon majus Townes, 1977
- Olixon martini Lohrmann, 2007
- Olixon melinsula Lohrmann, Fox, Solis & Krogmann, 2012
- Olixon myrmosaeforme (Arnold, 1935)
- Olixon pilbara Krogmann, Austin & Naumann, 2009
- Olixon saltator (Arnold, 1935)
- Olixon testaceum Cameron, 1887
- Olixon toliaraensis Lohrmann & Ohl, 2007
- Olixon wajuk Krogmann, Austin & Naumann, 2009
- Olixon waldockae Krogmann, Austin & Naumann, 2009
- Olixon wuthathi Krogmann, Austin & Naumann, 2009
- Olixon zonale Krogmann, Austin & Naumann, 2009
