= Sinuijumantispa =

Sinuijumantispa Temporal range: Barremian–Aptian

Scientific classification
- Kingdom: Animalia
- Phylum: Arthropoda
- Class: Insecta
- Order: Neuroptera
- Family: Mantispidae
- Genus: Sinuijumantispa; So & Wong, 2022
- Species: S. ryonsangiensis

Binomial name
- Sinuijumantispa ryonsangiensis So & Wong, 2022

Extinct genus of mantidflies

Sinuijumantispa is an extinct genus of mantidflies from the Early Cretaceous Sinuiju Formation in North Korea.
