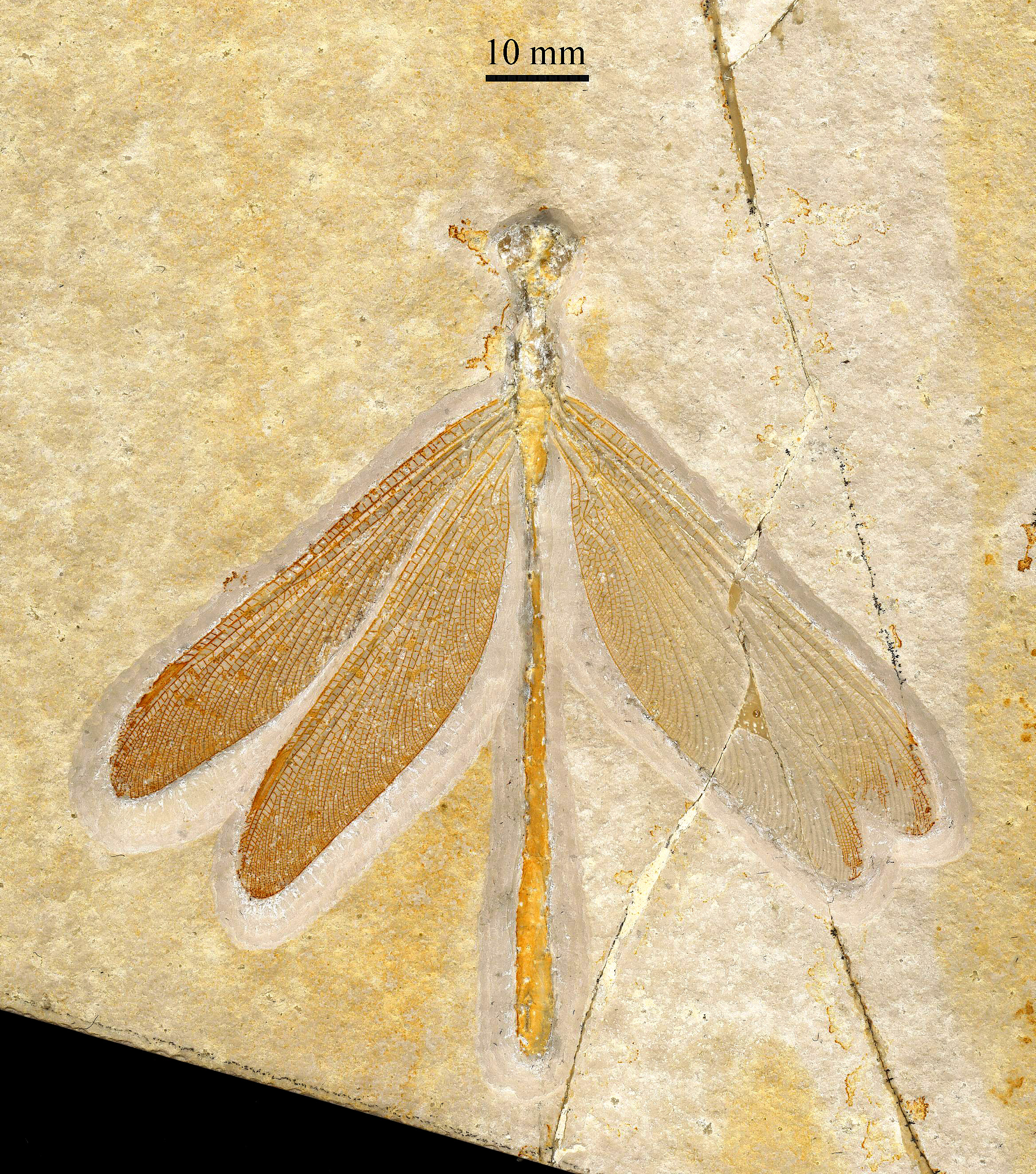
- Stenophlebia latreillei, Upper Jurassic, Solnhofen Plattenkalk, in private collection

Scientific classification
- Kingdom: Animalia
- Phylum: Arthropoda
- Clade: Pancrustacea
- Class: Insecta
- Order: Odonata
- Family: †Stenophlebiidae
- Genus: †Stenophlebia; Hagen, 1866

= Stenophlebia =

Stenophlebia Temporal range: 160–113 Ma

Extinct genus of dragonflies

Stenophlebia is an extinct genus of dragon-damselfly from late Jurassic and early Cretaceous period.

== Classification ==
This extinct genus includes the following nine described species:

  - S. amphitrite (Hagen, 1862) - Upper Jurassic, Germany (type species), 150 mya
  - S. corami Nel and Jarzembowski, 1996 - Lower Cretaceous, England, 145 mya
  - S. eichstaettensis Nel et al., 1993 - Upper Jurassic, Germany, 150 mya
  - S. karatavica Pritykina, 1968 - Upper Jurassic, Karabastau Formation, Kazakhstan, 160 mya
  - S. latreillei (Germar, 1839) - Upper Jurassic, Germany, 150 mya
  - S. liaoningensis Zheng et al., 2016 - Lower Cretaceous, China
  - S. lithographica (Giebel, 1857) - Upper Jurassic, Germany, 150 mya
  - S. phryne (Hagen, 1862) - Upper Jurassic, Germany, 150 mya
  - S. rolfhuggeri Bechly et al., 2003 - Upper Jurassic, Germany, 150 mya
  - S. ryonsangensis Won et al. 2021- Lower Cretaceous, Sinujiu Formation, North Korea, 125-113 mya
