= Paniscomima =

Scientific classification
- Domain: Eukaryota
- Kingdom: Animalia
- Phylum: Arthropoda
- Class: Insecta
- Order: Hymenoptera
- Family: Rhopalosomatidae
- Genus: Paniscomima; Enderlein, 1904

Type species
- Paniscomima erlangeriana Enderlein, 1904

Genus of wasps

Paniscomima is a genus of wasps in family Rhopalosomatidae. Members of this family are parasitic of crickets.

== Taxonomy ==
The genus contains the following species:

- Paniscomima abnormis (Morley, 1910)
- Paniscomima angelae Guidotti, 2007
- Paniscomima bekilyi (Berland, 1951)
- Paniscomima curta Townes, 1977
- Paniscomima darlingi Guidotti, 2007
- Paniscomima erlangeriana Enderlein, 1904
- Paniscomima kilombero Lohrmann, 2011
- Paniscomima lottacontinua Guidotti, 2007
- Paniscomima mulanje Lohrmann, 2011
- Paniscomima opposita Townes, 1977
- Paniscomima paropposita Guidotti, 2007
- Paniscomima rufoantennata (Berland, 1951)
- Paniscomima seyrigi (Berland, 1951)
