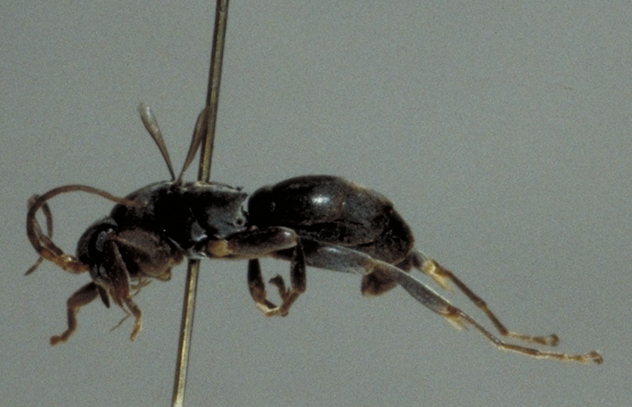
- Olixon sp.

Scientific classification
- Kingdom: Animalia
- Phylum: Arthropoda
- Class: Insecta
- Order: Hymenoptera
- Superfamily: Vespoidea
- Family: Rhopalosomatidae; Brues, 1922

Genera
- See text

= Rhopalosomatidae =

Rhopalosomatidae Temporal range: Cenomanian–Present

Family of insects

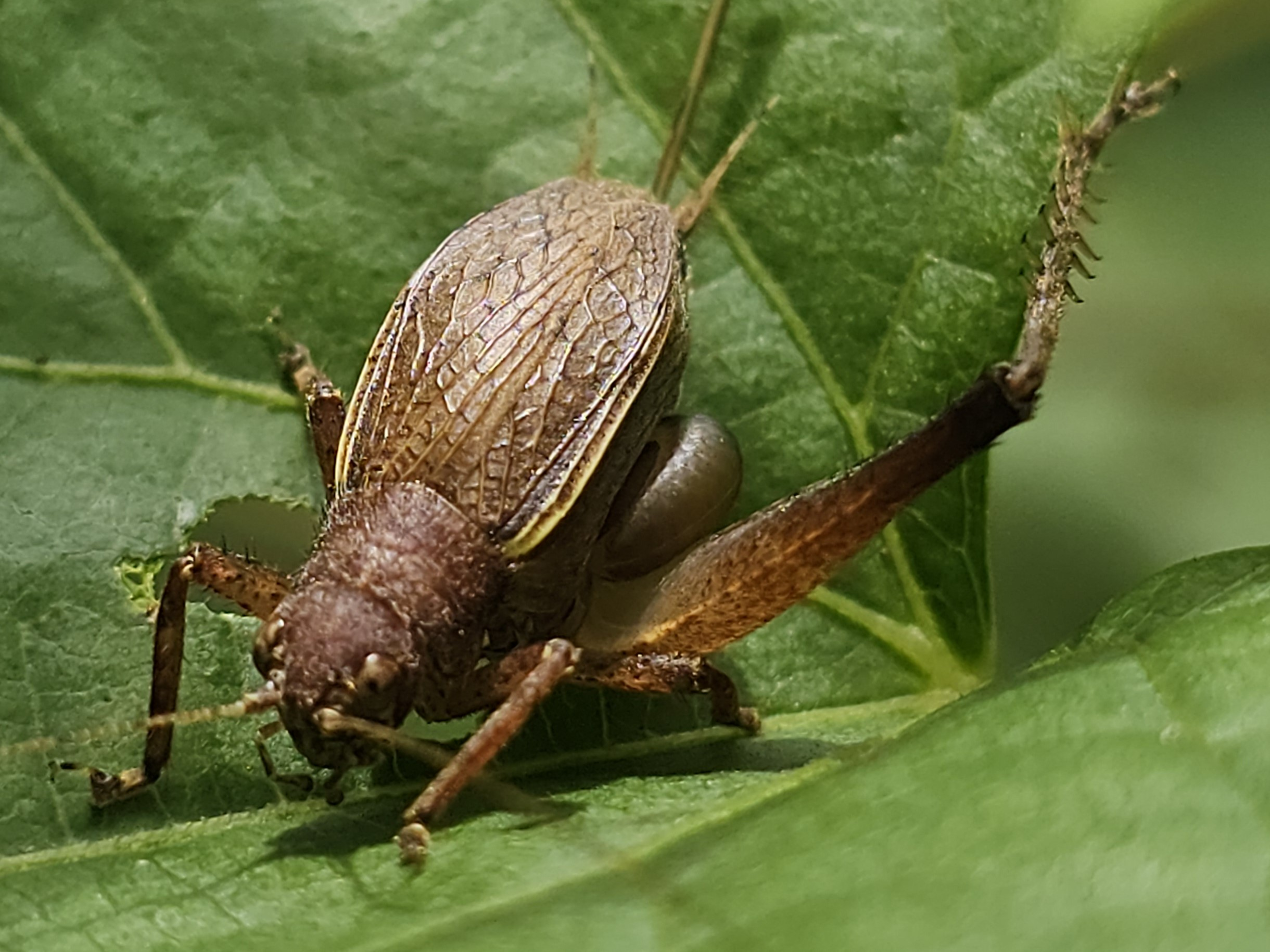
A rhopalosomatid larva attached to a Hapithus cricket

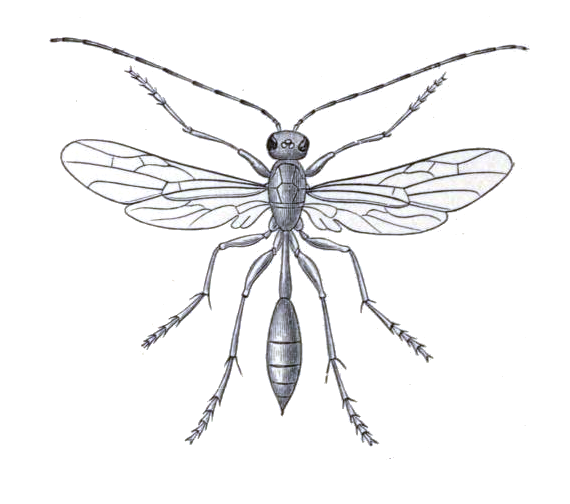
Rhopalosoma poeyi female

Rhopalosomatidae is a family of Hymenoptera containing about 68 extant species in four genera that are found worldwide. Three fossil genera are known.

The adults resemble ants and may be confused with them. They are yellowish with red or brown markings, but may be all brown in colour. Winged species are usually nocturnal, while wingless or reduced-wing species are mainly diurnal. They are solitary, and the larvae are ectoparasitic on orthopteran nymphs. Adults have the tips of two or more antennal segments with spines. The hindwing (when present) has distinct claval and jugal lobes. The metatibia has a calcar or curved spur.

Rhopalosoma is a New World genus (17 spp.) with most species from Central and South America. Olixon (26 spp.) is distributed through Africa and Australia and the New World. Paniscomima (11 spp.) is known from India, Madagascar, Africa, and Southeast Asia. Most species of Liosphex (14 spp.) are found from the southern US to Central and South America, with one species, L. trichopleurum, known from the Philippines and Indonesia. Mesorhopalosoma cearae is a fossil known from Brazil.

== Taxonomy ==
The family has four extant and two extinct genera:

- Subfamily Rhopalosomatinae Ashmead, 1896

- †Cretolixon Lohrmann in Lohrmann et al., 2020 Burmese amber, Myanmar, mid-Cretaceous
- †Eorhopalosoma Engel, 2008 Kachin amber, Myanmar, Cenomanian
- Liosphex Townes, 1977
- Paniscomima Enderlein, 1904
- Rhopalosoma Cresson, 1865

- Subfamily Olixoninae Engel, 2008

- Olixon Cameron, 1887

The extinct genera †Mesorhopalosoma Darling, 1990 and †Paleorhopalosoma Nel, Azar & Hervet, 2010 have been moved to the separate family Angarosphecidae.
