= Mesorhopalosoma =

Scientific classification
- Kingdom: Animalia
- Phylum: Arthropoda
- Clade: Pancrustacea
- Class: Insecta
- Order: Hymenoptera
- Family: Rhopalosomatidae
- Genus: †Mesorhopalosoma; Darling, 1990

Extinct genus of insects

Mesorhopalosoma is an extinct genus of wasps in family Rhopalosomatidae.

== Taxonomy ==
The genus contains the following species:

- Mesorhopalosoma cearae Darling, 1990
