= Paleorhopalosoma =

Paleorhopalosoma Temporal range: Paleocene, 61.7–58.7 Ma

Scientific classification
- Kingdom: Animalia
- Phylum: Arthropoda
- Class: Insecta
- Order: Hymenoptera
- Family: Rhopalosomatidae
- Genus: †Paleorhopalosoma; Nel, Azar & Hervetl, 2010

Extinct genus of wasps

Paleorhopalosoma is an extinct genus of wasps in family Rhopalosomatidae.

== Taxonomy ==
The genus contains the following species:

- Paleorhopalosoma menatensis Nel, Azar & Hervet, 2010
