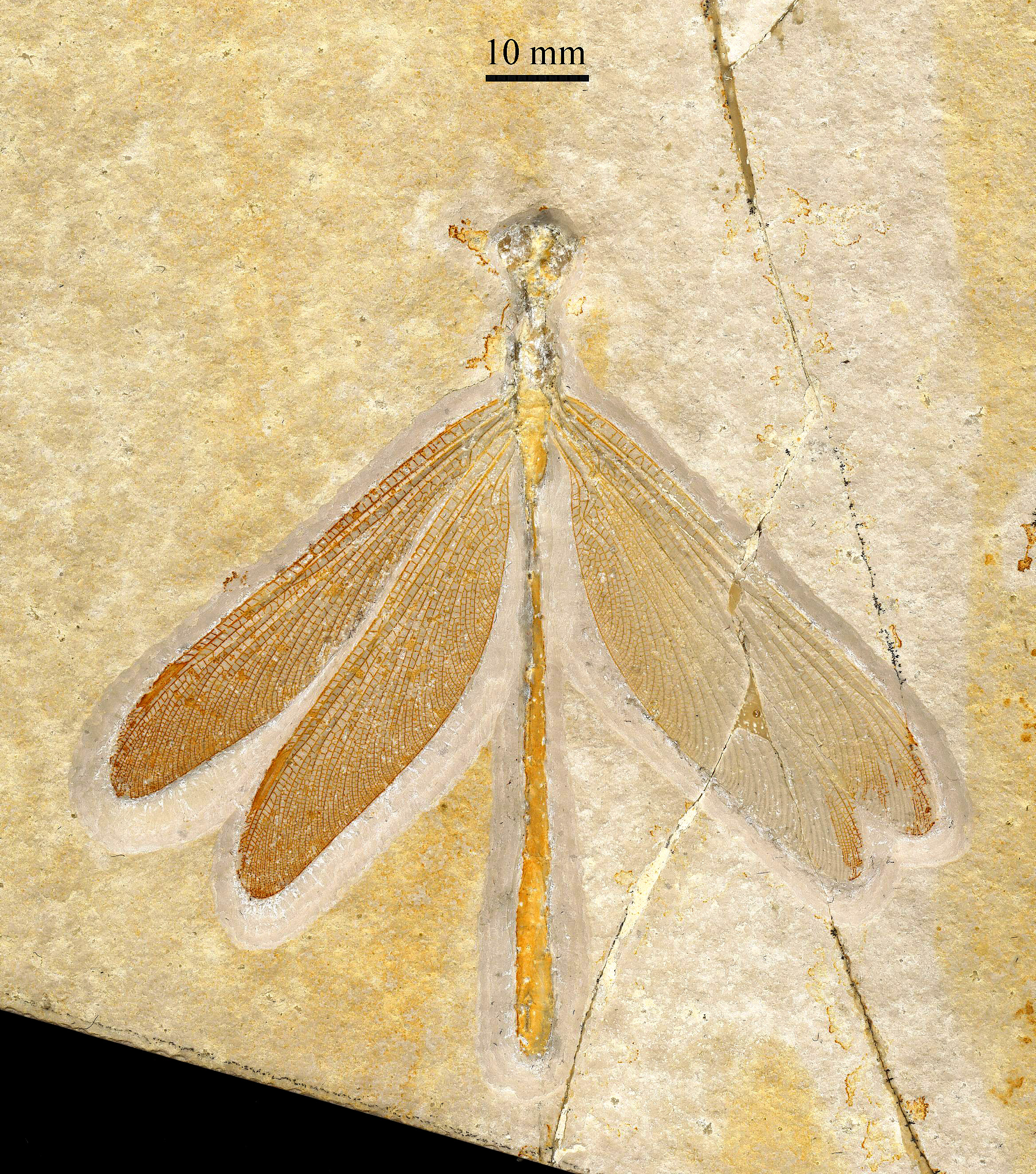
- Stenophlebia latreillei, Upper Jurassic, Solnhofen Plattenkalk, in private collection

Scientific classification
- Kingdom: Animalia
- Phylum: Arthropoda
- Clade: Pancrustacea
- Class: Insecta
- Order: Odonata
- Infraorder: †Stenophlebioptera
- Superfamily: †Stenophlebioidea
- Family: †Stenophlebiidae; Needham, 1903

Type genus
- Stenophlebia Hagen, 1866

Genera
- †Burmastenophlebia; †Cratostenophlebia; †Cretastenophlebia; †Gallostenophlebia; †Hispanostenophlebia; †Liaostenophlebia; †Mesostenophlebia; †Stenophlebia; †Yixianstenophlebia

Synonyms
- †Nothomacromiidae? Carle, 1995

= Stenophlebiidae =

Stenophlebiidae Temporal range: 160–99 Ma Upper Jurassic - Upper Cretaceous

Extinct family of insects

The Stenophlebiidae is an extinct family of medium-sized to large fossil odonates from the Upper Jurassic and Cretaceous period that belongs to the damsel-dragonfly grade ("anisozygopteres") within the stem group of Anisoptera. They are characterized by their long and slender wings, and the transverse shape of the discoidal triangles in their wing venation.

== Description ==
=== Adult ===
==== Body ====
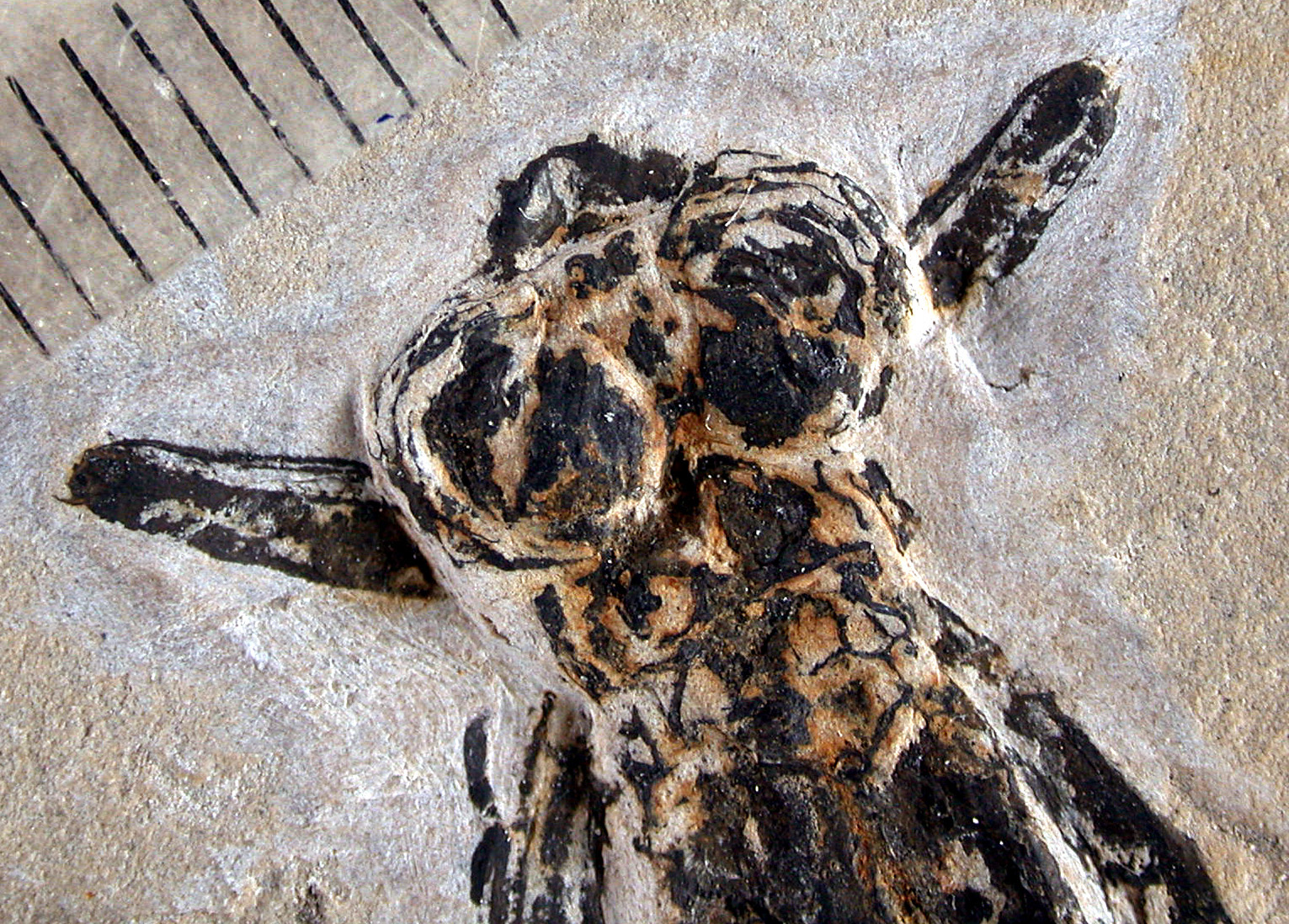
Cratostenophlebia schwickert, Lower Cretaceous, Brazil, head of male holotype

The head is similar to that of Recent Gomphidae with two large and globular compound eyes that are distinctly separated. The three ocelli are arranged in a triangle on the globular vertex. The mandibles are strong. The legs have short and strong spines.

==== Wings and wing venation ====
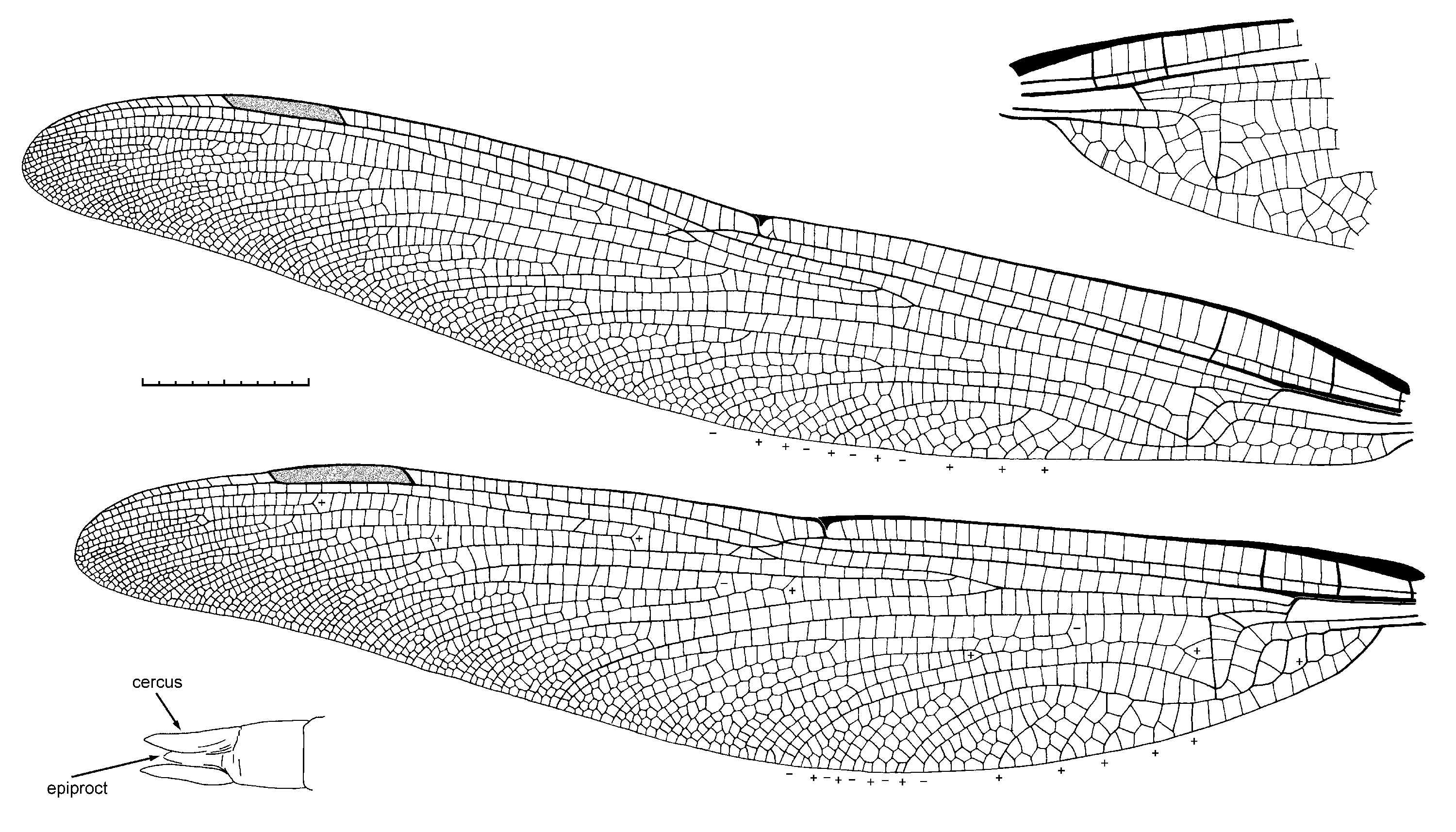
Stenophlebia amphitrite, Upper Jurassic, Solnhofen Plattenkalk, drawing of wing venation and terminalia

The largest species Stenophlebia amphitrite reached a wingspan of about 17.3 centimetres (6.8 in), while the smallest species Hispanostenophlebia barremiana reached only a wingspan of about 7.7 centimetres (3.0 in).

Stenophlebiidae are distinguished by the following set of eight derived wing characters (synapomorphies):
(1) a long not zigzagged secondary longitudinal convex vein in the postdiscoidal area, parallel to MP, the base of this vein being just distal of the discoidal triangle; (2) Cr long or very long, covering more than one or two cells between RA and RP; (3) pterostigma shifted basally; (4) pterostigma very long; (5) hindwing subdiscoidal space transverse and crossed by two veins or more; (6) the four wings elongate and more or less falcate; (7) forewing discoidal triangle long transverse; (8) numerous and well defined straight intercalary secondary longitudinal veins reaching posterior wing margin.

Furthermore they share the following four synapomorphies with Prostenophlebiidae in the superfamily Stenophlebioidea:
(1) a long and not zigzagged (or slightly zigzagged) secondary longitudinal convex vein in postdiscoidal area, parallel to MP, the base of this vein being about two or three cells or just distal of discoidal triangle; (2) a long and not zigzagged concave Mspl; (3) oblique vein "O" absent; (4) wings elongate.

And they share these four synapomorphies with Prostenophlebiidae and Liassostenophlebiidae in the suborder Stenophlebioptera:
(1) nodal crossvein Cr very oblique, i.e. angle Cr-RA > 140°; (2) subnodus Sn very oblique, with or without cross-veins reaching it; (3) CuAa with a broad area between the two most distal posterior branches; (4) presence of straight supplementary longitudinal veins in the areas between IR2 and MP near posterior wing margin.

==== Sexual dimorphism ====
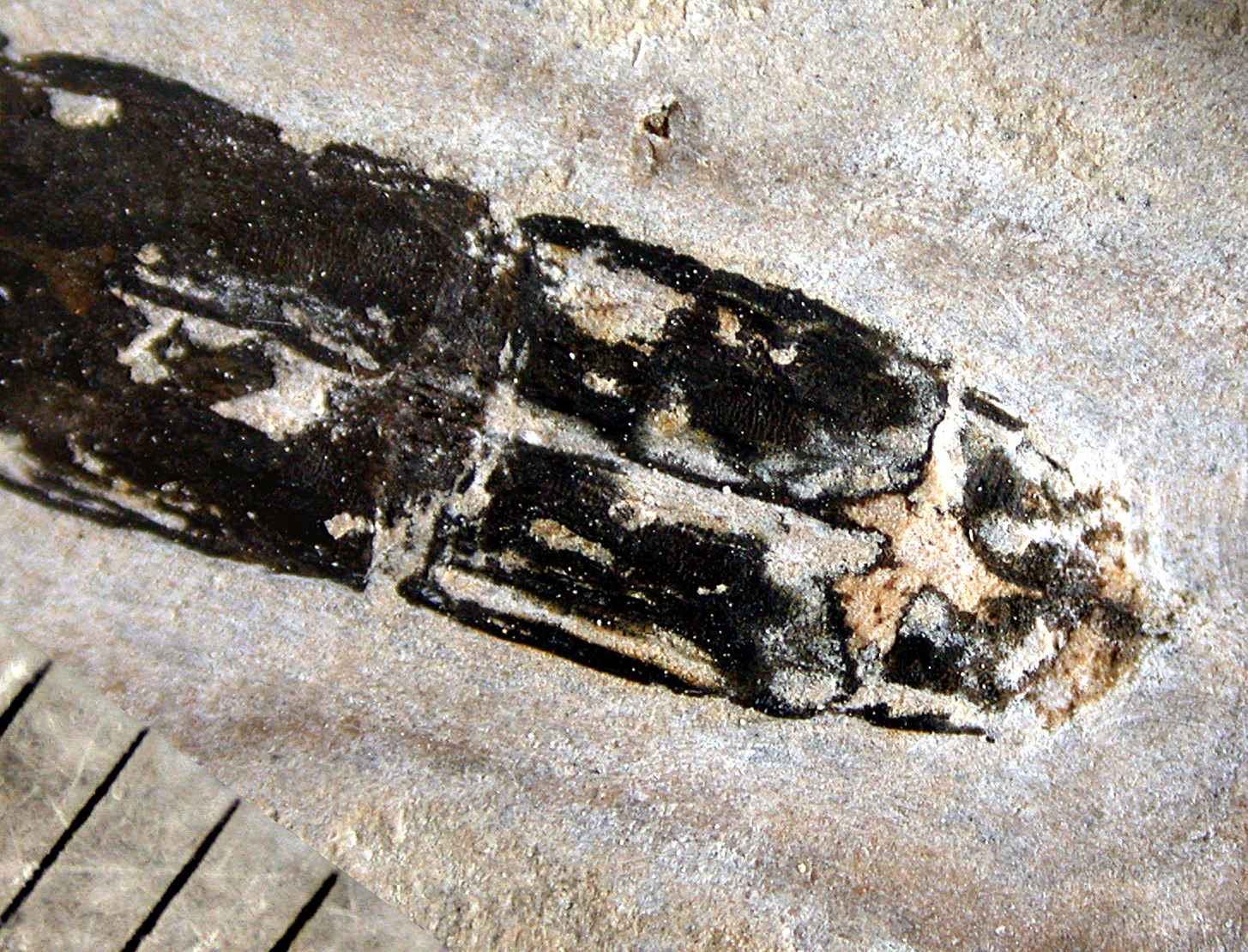
Cratostenophlebia schwickert, Lower Cretaceous, Brazil, cerci of male holotype

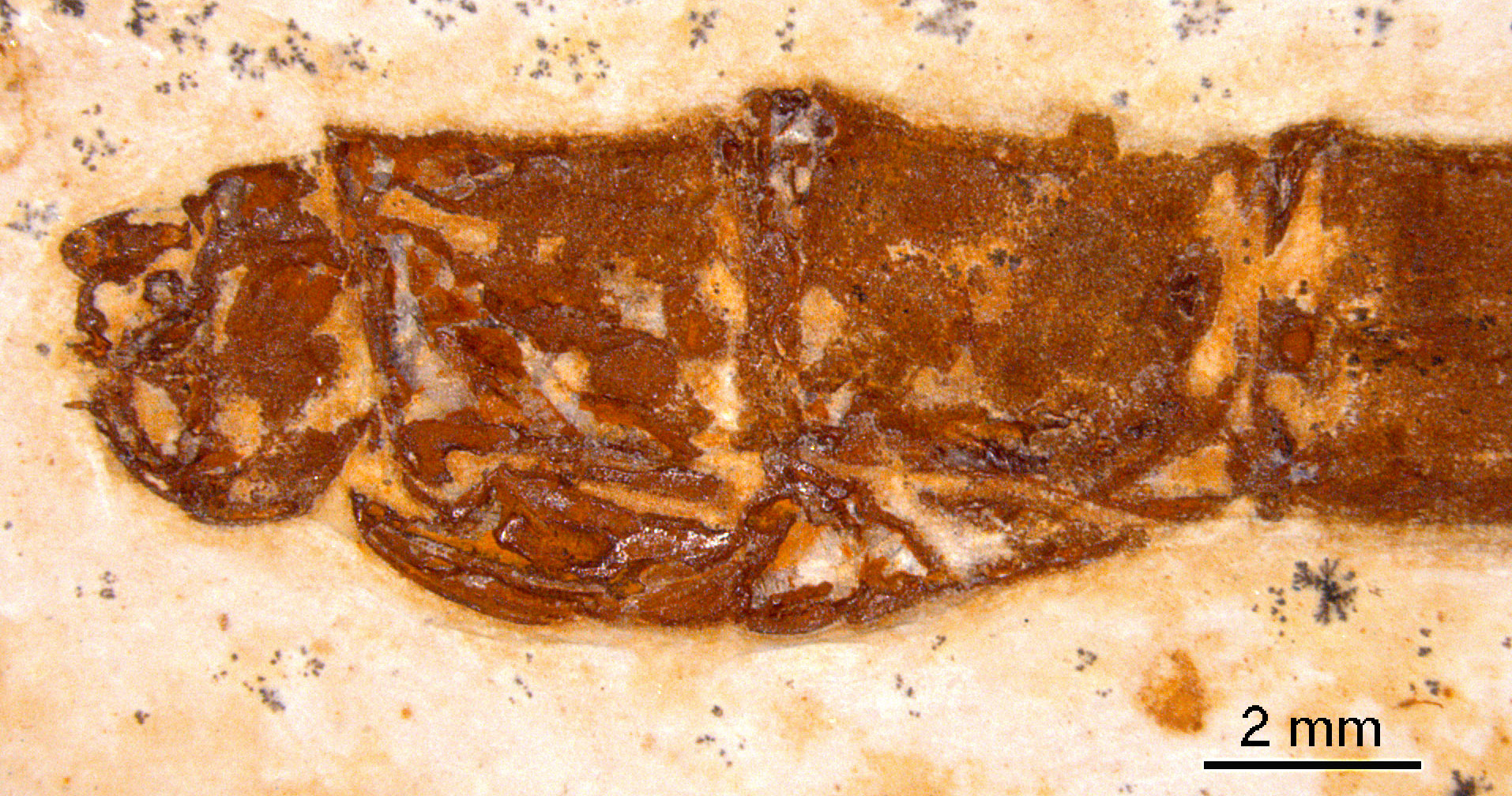
Cratostenophlebia schwickerti, Lower Cretaceous, Brazil, ovipositor of female allotype specimen

Males are distinguished by a weak anal angle of the hindwing base and in some species of Upper Jurassic Stenophlebia by a club-like dilation of the terminal part of the abdomen. The male secondary genitalia are unknown, but probably were of the anisopterid type. The male terminalia of the abdomen are of the anisopterid type, thus composed of a pair of dorsal claspers (cerci) and an unpaired ventral process (epiproct).

Nel et al. (1993) stated that the female ovipositor is reduced, while Bechly (2007, 2010) could demonstrate that at least the female of the stenophlebiid genus Cratostenophlebia had a distinct endophytic ovipositor.

=== Larva ===
Fossil larvae of this extinct family have not been formally described yet, but Bechly (2007) suggested that the Nothomacromia larvae from the Lower Cretaceous Crato Formation of Brazil may be the larvae of Cratostenophlebia.

== Classification ==
The family group taxon was established by Needham (1903) as subfamily Stenophlebinae (sic) of the extinct damsel-dragonfly family Heterophlebiidae. It was emended and elevated to family rank Stenophlebiidae by Handlirsch (1906). Stenophlebia Hagen, 1866 is the type genus of this family.

The species Sinostenophlebia zhanjiakouensis was originally assigned to the family Stenophlebiidae; however, the position and status of this species is very uncertain due to the poor preservation and insufficient original description. Zheng et al. (2016) transferred this species to the family Aeschnidiidae, and considered the genus Sinostenophlebia to be a likely junior synonym of the genus Leptaeschnidium.

Bechly (2005) could show that the very small species "Stenophlebia" casta from the Upper Jurassic Solnhofen Plattenkalk of Germany is not related to Stenophlebiidae. It is now classified as Parastenophlebia casta in a separate family Parastenophlebiidae that belongs to the extinct damsel-dragonfly suborder Heterophlebioptera.

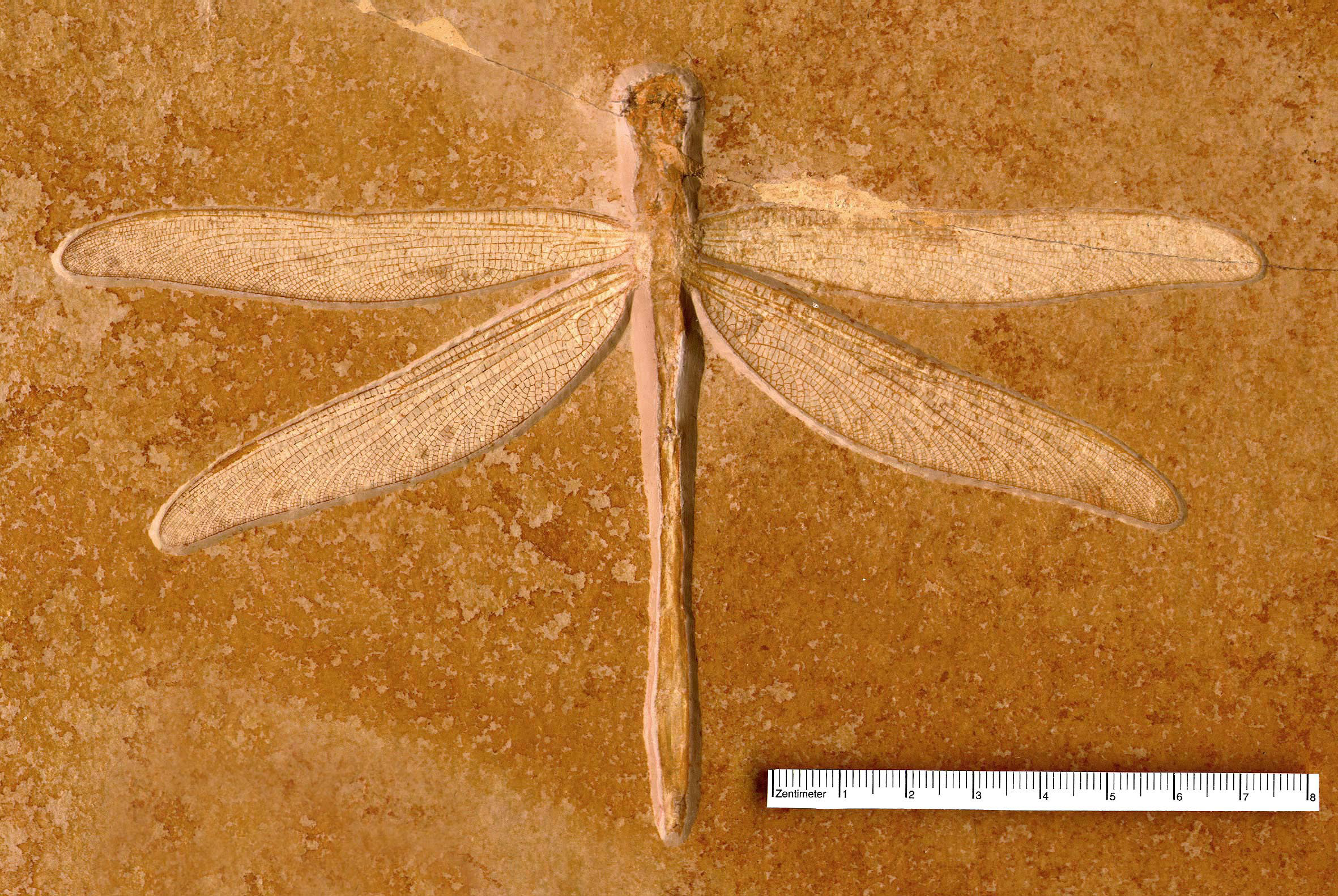
Stenophlebia amphitrite, Upper Jurassic, Solnhofen Plattenkalk, in private collection

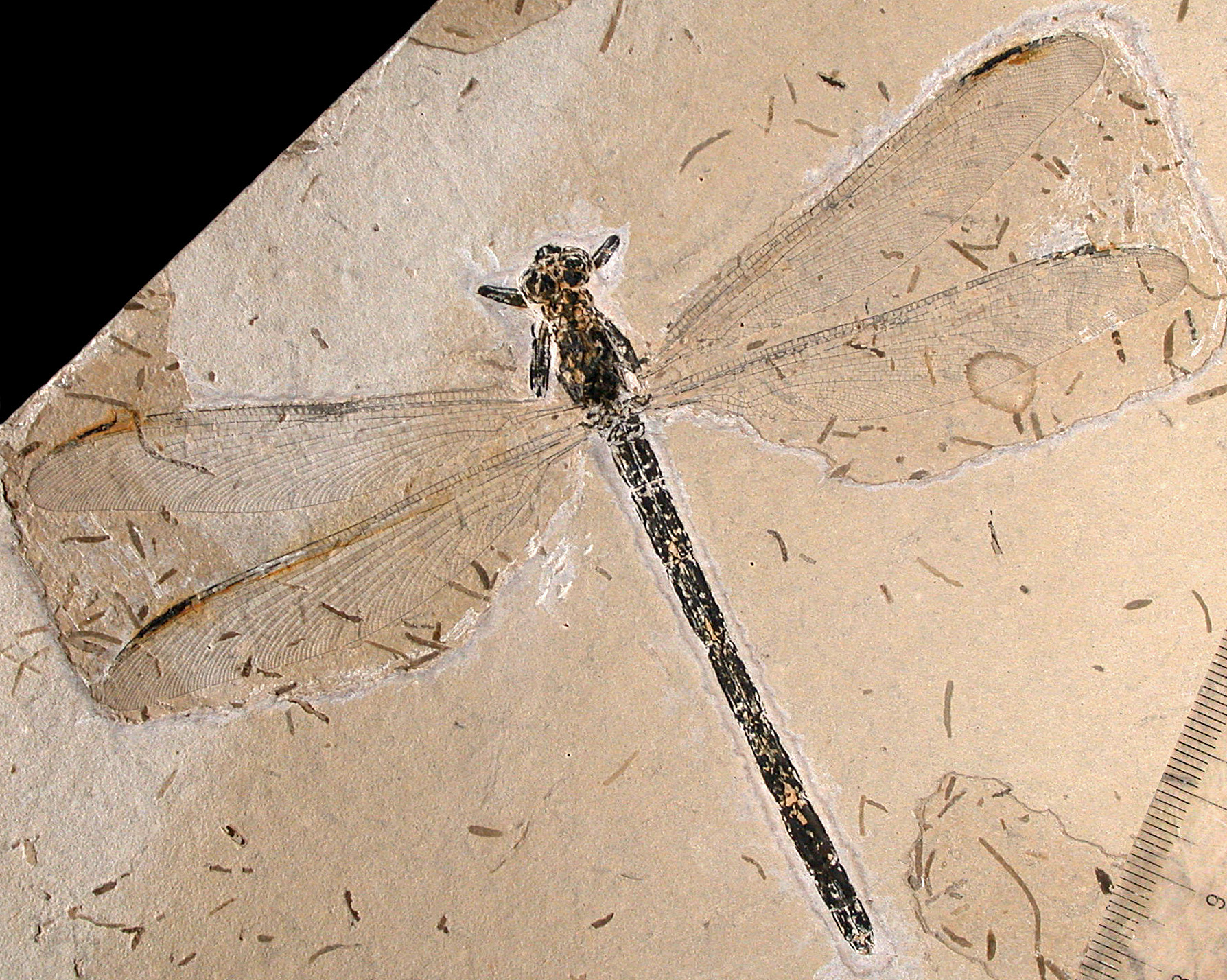
Cratostenophlebia schwickerti, Lower Cretaceous, Brazil, male holotype

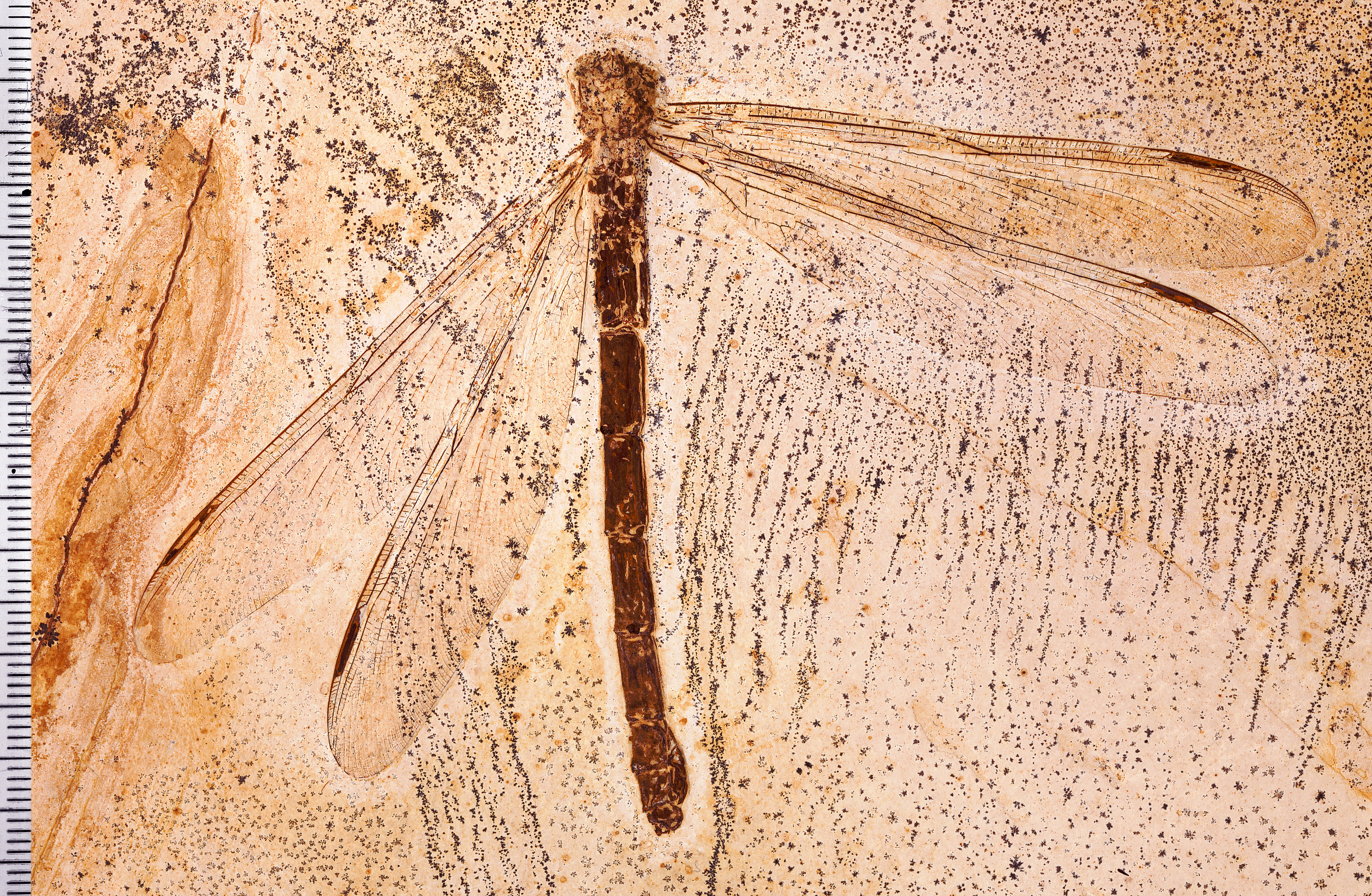
Cratostenophlebia schwickerti, Lower Cretaceous, Brazil, female allotype

The family contains 9 described genera with a total of 18 species:

- Genus †Stenophlebia Hagen, 1866 (type genus)
  - †Stenophlebia amphitrite (Hagen, 1862) - (type species; type locality: Eichstätt, Germany; type horizon: Upper Jurassic, Malm zeta 2b, Lower Tithonian / 150 mya, Hybonotum Zone, Solnhofener Plattenkalk Formation; lectotype: no. AS I 1025a,b at BSPG Munich Museum; size: forewing 83.4 and hindwing 81.1 mm)
  - †Stenophlebia? corami Nel and Jarzembowski, 1996 - (type locality: National Grid Reference SZ 038784, Swanage, Durlston Bay, Dorset, England; type horizon: Lower Cretaceous, Earliest Berriasian / 145 mya, Clement's Bed 175, Corbula Beds / Middle Purbeck Beds, Durlston Formation; holotype: costo-median part of a wing no. 018957/-8 in coll. Robert Coram; estimated size: wing 55.0 mm)
  - †Stenophlebia eichstaettensis Nel et al., 1993 - (type locality: Eichstätt, Germany; type horizon: Upper Jurassic, Malm zeta 2b, Lower Tithonian / 150 mya, Hybonotum Zone, Solnhofener Plattenkalk Formation; holotype: no. SOS 2329 at Jura-Museum Eichstätt; size: forewing 69.0 and hindwing 69.0 mm)
  - †Stenophlebia karatavica Pritykina, 1968 - (type locality: Karatau-Mikhailovka, Chimkent region, Southern Kazakhstan; type horizon: Upper Jurassic, Callovian- Kimmeridgian or Oxfordian-Kimmeridgian / 163 mya, Karabastau Formation; holotype: no. PIN 2066/26 at Palaeontological Institute Moscow; size: forewing 48.0 mm)
  - †Stenophlebia latreillei (Germar, 1839) - (type locality: Eichstätt, Germany; type horizon: Upper Jurassic, Malm zeta 2b, Lower Tithonian / 150 mya, Hybonotum Zone, Solnhofener Plattenkalk Formation; lectotype: no. 1870/VII/35 at BSPG Munich Museum; size: forewing 55.4 and hindwing 54.7 mm)
  - †Stenophlebia liaoningensis Zheng et al. 2016- (Lower Cretaceous (Aptian) Yixian Formation of western Liaoning, China)
  - †Stenophlebia? lithographica (Giebel, 1857) - (nomen dubium; type locality: Eichstätt, Germany; type horizon: Upper Jurassic, Malm zeta 2b, Lower Tithonian / 150 mya, Hybonotum Zone, Solnhofener Plattenkalk Formation; holotype: at University of Heidelberg, probably lost; size: wings about 55 mm; maybe a synonym of S. phryne or S. latreillei)
  - †Stenophlebia phryne (Hagen, 1862) - (type locality: Eichstätt, Germany; type horizon: Upper Jurassic, Malm zeta 2b, Lower Tithonian / 150 mya, Hybonotum Zone, Solnhofener Plattenkalk Formation; lectotype: MCZ 6212 at Harvard University; size: forewing 55.0 mm)
  - †Stenophlebia rolfhuggeri Bechly et al., 2003 - (type locality: Nusplingen quarry, Germany; type horizon: Upper Jurassic, Germany, Late Kimmeridgian / 152 mya, Beckeri Zone, Ulmense Subzone, unit C, Nusplingen Limestone Formation; holotype: no. SMNS 65217 at the State Museum of Natural History Stuttgart; size: forewing 80.0 and hindwing 76.0 mm)
- Genus †Burmastenophlebia Huang, Fu & Nel, 2019
  - †Burmastenophlebia flecki Huang, Fu & Nel, 2019 - (Upper Cretaceous (Cenomanian) Burmese amber)
- Genus †Cratostenophlebia Bechly, 2007
  - †Cratostenophlebia schwickert Bechly, 2007 - (type locality: Chapada do Araripe, vicinity of Nova Olinda, NE Brazil; type horizon: Lower Cretaceous / 112 mya, Upper Aptian, Nova Olinda Member of Crato Formation; male holotype: no. WDC 136 in coll. Burkhard Pohl; female allotype: no. WDC 137 in coll. Burkhard Pohl; size: forewings 61.3-63 and hindwings 62.4-63.3 mm)
- Genus †Cretastenophlebia Fleck et al., 2003
  - †Cretastenophlebia jiuquanensis Zheng et al. 2018- (Lower Cretaceous (Albian) Zhonggou Formation, China)
  - †Cretastenophlebia mongolica Fleck et al. 2003 - (type locality: Bon Tsagaan, Bayanhongor Aimak, Central Mongolia; type horizon: Lower Cretaceous, Hauterivian/Barremian / 129 mya, Dzun-Bain Formation; holotype: isolated male hindwing no. PIN 3559/10180 at Palaeontological Institute Moscow; size: hindwing 40.0 mm)
- Genus †Gallostenophlebia Nel et al. 2015
  - †Gallostenophlebia incompleta Nel et al. 2015- (Upper Cretaceous (Cenomanian); Jaunay-Clan locality, Vienne, France)
- Genus †Hispanostenophlebia Fleck et al., 2003
  - †Hispanostenophlebia barremiana Fleck et al., 2003 - (type locality: Las Hoyas, Unit 3, 4 km NW of Pueblo de La Cierva, Spain; type horizon: Lower Cretaceous, Upper Barremian - Aptian / 125 mya, second member of Formation Calizas de la Huérguina; holotype: isolated female? hindwing no. ADR–0315–I at Museo de Cuenca; size: hindwing 36.1 mm)
- Genus †Liaostenophlebia Zheng et al. 2016
  - †Liaostenophlebia yixianensis Zheng et al. 2016- (Lower Cretaceous Yixian Formation of western Liaoning, China)
- Genus †Mesostenophlebia Fleck et al., 2003
  - †Mesostenophlebia anglicana Fleck et al., 2003 - (type locality: Swanage, Durlston Bay, Dorset, England; type horizon: Lower Cretaceous, Earliest Berriasian / 145 mya, Clements' Bed DB36c, Hard Cockle Beds / Lower Purbeck Beds, Lulworth Formation; holotype: incomplete wing no. MNEMG 1996.93a,b at Maidstone Museum; estimated size: wing 38.0 mm)
- Genus †Yixianstenophlebia Nel & Huang 2015
  - †Yixianstenophlebia magnifica Nel & Huang 2015- (Lower Cretaceous Yixian Formation of Inner Mongolia, China)

== Phylogeny ==
The set of shared derived characters listed in the description section above demonstrate that Stenophlebiidae is clearly a monophyletic group (clade).

Before the advent of cladistic classification Stenophebiidae was classified within the odonate suborder Anisozyoptera, which was later recognized to be a paraphyletic grade. In modern classifications the taxon Anisozygoptera is therefore either abandoned or restricted to the Recent relict family Epiophlebiidae.
Bechly (1996) established a new suborder Stenophlebioptera for Stenophlebiidae and its closest relatives. Stenophlebioptera is closer related to Anisoptera than Epiophlebiidae.

The extinct family Prostenophlebiidae is the sister group of Stenophlebiidae within the superfamily Stenophlebioidea. Stenophlebioidea is the sister group of Liassostenophlebiidae within the suborder Stenophlebioptera.

Nel et al. (1993) suggested that Recent Epiophlebiidae is the sister group of Stenophlebiidae within a superfamily Epiophlebioidea, and Bechly (1996) suggested that extinct Gondvanogomphidae is the sister group of Stenophlebiidae within Stenophlebioptera. However, these hypotheses have been refuted by Fleck et al. (2003).

The phylogenetic position of Stenophlebiidae according to Bechly (1996, 2007) and Fleck et al. (2003, 2004):

- Odonatoptera
  - †Tarsophlebioptera
  - Odonata
    - Zygoptera
    - - †Sieblosiidae
      - Epiprocta
        - †Isophlebioptera
        - - Anisozygoptera (restricted to Recent Epiophlebiidae)
          - - †Heterophlebioptera
            - - †Stenophlebioptera
                - †Jurastenophlebiidae
                - †Stenophlebioidea
                  - †Prostenophlebiidae
                  - †Stenophlebiidae
              - - Anisoptera

== Biology ==
Next to nothing is known about the ecology and behavior of Stenophlebiidae, but it probably was quite similar to Recent odonates. The shape of the wings suggests that they were slow flyers that fed on smaller flying insects. The females probably inserted their eggs into plants in or close to the water.

== Geographical and geological distribution ==
The fossil record of this family ranges from Upper Jurassic of Germany (Solnhofen Plattenkalk, Nusplingen limestones) and Kazakhstan (Karabastau Svita) to the Lower Cretaceous of Brazil (Crato Formation), Mongolia (Bon Tsagaan), Spain (Las Hoyas), and England (Durlston Formation) to the Upper Cretaceous (Cenomanian) of France and Myanmar.

== History ==
Larger revisions of this family have been provided by Nel et al. (1993) and Fleck et al. (2003).

=== Earliest finds ===
The first stenophlebiid fossil was described as "Agrion" latreillei by Germar (1839) from the Upper Jurassic Solnhofen Plattenkalk of Germany.

=== Notable specimens ===
Beside the important type specimens there are also several exceptionally well preserved fossils that contribute to our knowledge of the morphology of Stenophlebiidae. These include specimens of Stenophlebia amphitrite and Stenophlebia latreillei in several private fossil collections.
