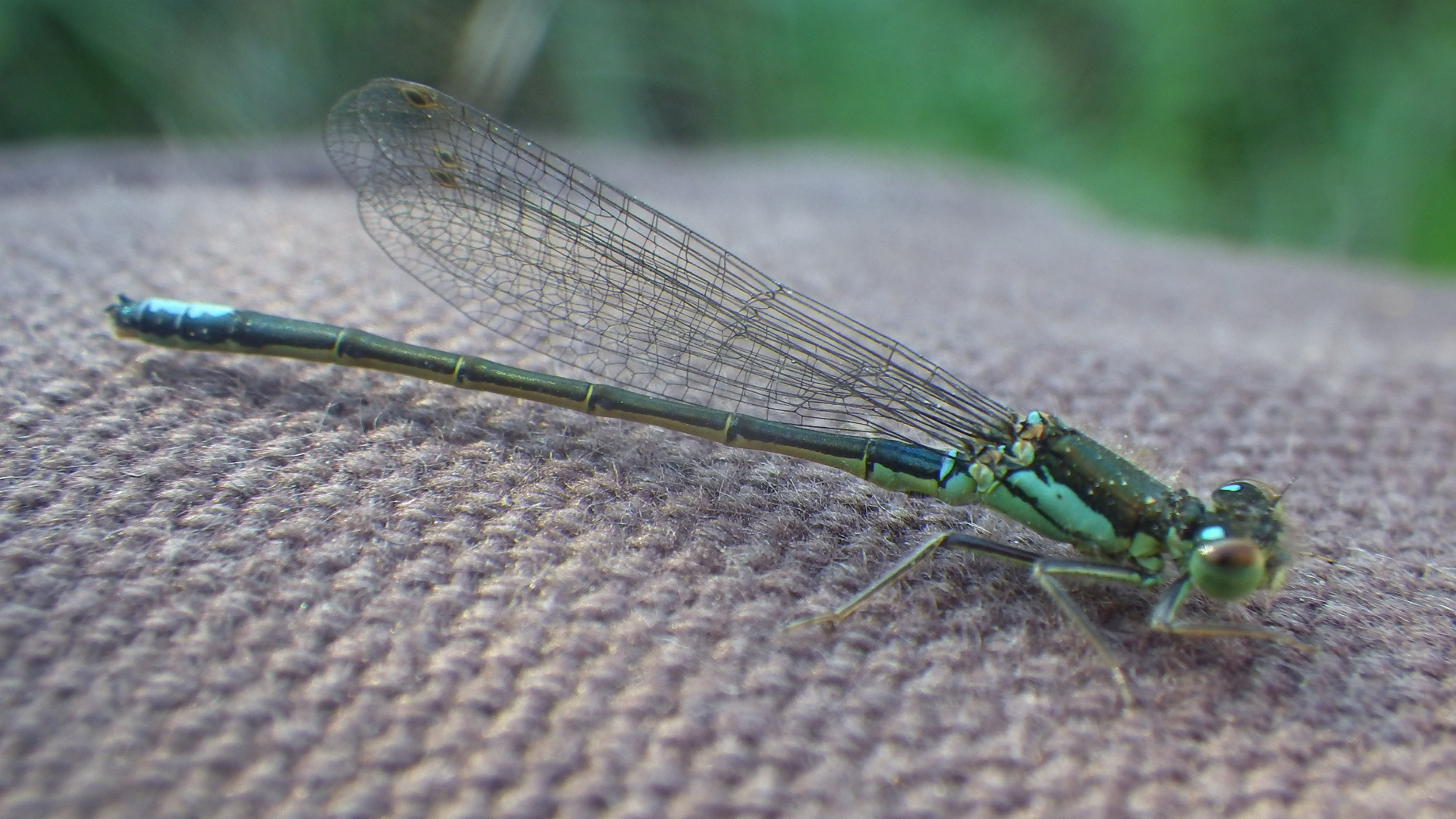

Conservation status
- Endangered (IUCN 3.1)

Scientific classification
- Kingdom: Animalia
- Phylum: Arthropoda
- Clade: Pancrustacea
- Class: Insecta
- Order: Odonata
- Suborder: Zygoptera
- Family: Coenagrionidae
- Genus: Ischnura
- Species: I. gemina

Binomial name
- Ischnura gemina (Kennedy, 1917)

Synonyms
- Celaenura gemina Kennedy, 1917

= Ischnura gemina =

Species of damselfly

Ischnura gemina is a species of damselfly in the family Coenagrionidae known by the common name San Francisco forktail. It is endemic to the San Francisco Bay Area in California in the United States. This uncommon insect has a total range of less than 500 square miles in the Bay Area, occurring only in greater San Francisco and parts of San Mateo and Marin Counties. This species is "one of the rarest Odonates in the United States."

== Biology ==
This damselfly is about 2.5 centimeters long. The male is mostly black with blue sides on the thorax and blue dots toward the tip of the abdomen. The female has dull green coloration on the sides of the thorax. This species is similar to Ischnura denticollis, and can be distinguished by the shape of the male genital appendages. The two species are thought to hybridize.

This damselfly is active between March and November, and adults are known to live over 30 days, a relatively long adult life for damselflies. This species occurs in coastal regions of the Bay Area; it is thought that its long life and long flight season are adaptations to the foggy climate of the region.

The natural habitat of the species is the various wetland ecosystems of the San Francisco Bay Area, including seepages and ponds. It can tolerate some disturbance, such as channelization of waterways, as long as there is marshy vegetation cover. The larvae develop in the cover of aquatic plants and the adults feed on other wetland arthropods.

== Ecology ==
Populations of this damselfly have been extirpated due to the destruction and degradation of habitat in the heavily urbanized area where it occurs. It lived in wetland habitat in Glen Canyon Park in the city of San Francisco until these moist spots were fragmented too extensively to support populations. After patches of wetland in the park were restored, the damselfly was reintroduced and persisted for a short while before disappearing once more. Though the reintroduction failed, it provided data about the habitat requirements for the insect.

This had been designated an endangered species on the IUCN Red List because of its very small range, small populations within that range, and extensive destruction of its habitat. It has been downgraded to vulnerable status because it has been located at a few more sites, it has good dispersal ability, and it is relatively resistant to some of the forms of habitat degradation that it faces, such as pollution.
