= Ischnura abyssinica =

Conservation status
- Near Threatened (IUCN 3.1)

Scientific classification
- Kingdom: Animalia
- Phylum: Arthropoda
- Clade: Pancrustacea
- Class: Insecta
- Order: Odonata
- Suborder: Zygoptera
- Family: Coenagrionidae
- Genus: Ischnura
- Species: I. abyssinica

Binomial name
- Ischnura abyssinica Martin, 1907

Species of damselfly

Ischnura abyssinica, the ethiopian bluetail, is a species of damselfly in the family Coenagrionidae. It is endemic to Ethiopia. Its natural habitats are subtropical or tropical high-altitude grassland, rivers, swamps, freshwater lakes, intermittent freshwater lakes, and freshwater marshes. It is threatened by habitat loss.
