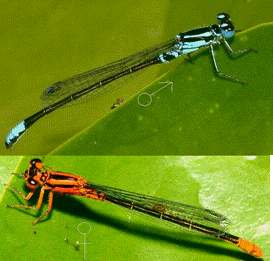

Conservation status
- Least Concern (IUCN 3.1)

Scientific classification
- Kingdom: Animalia
- Phylum: Arthropoda
- Clade: Pancrustacea
- Class: Insecta
- Order: Odonata
- Suborder: Zygoptera
- Family: Coenagrionidae
- Genus: Ischnura
- Species: I. kellicotti

Binomial name
- Ischnura kellicotti Williamson, 1898

= Ischnura kellicotti =

Species of damselfly

Ischnura kellicotti, the lilypad forktail, is a species of narrow-winged damselfly in the family Coenagrionidae. It is found in North America.

The IUCN conservation status of Ischnura kellicotti is "LC", least concern, with no immediate threat to the species' survival. The population is stable. The IUCN status was reviewed in 2017.

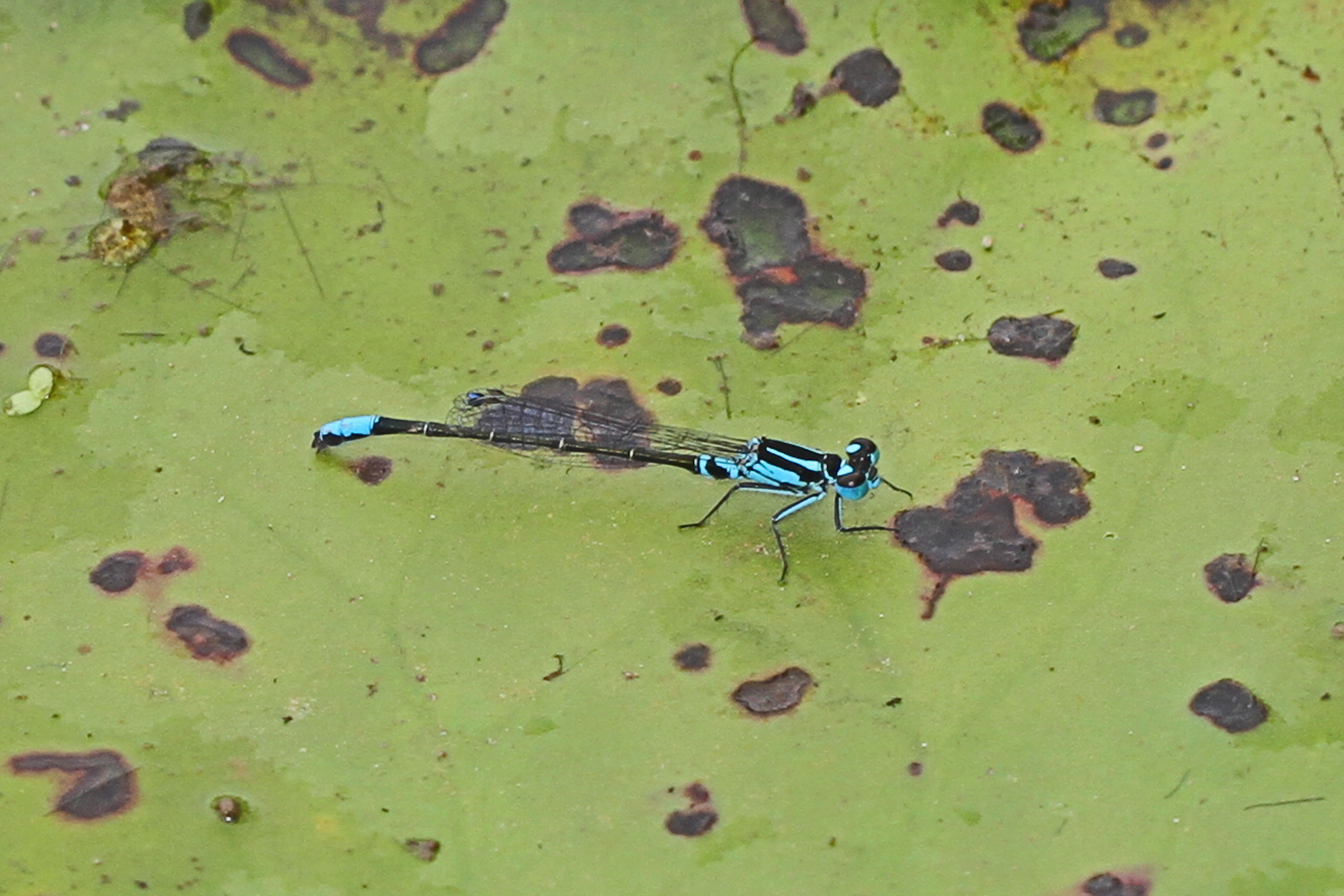
Lilypad forktail, Ischnura kellicotti

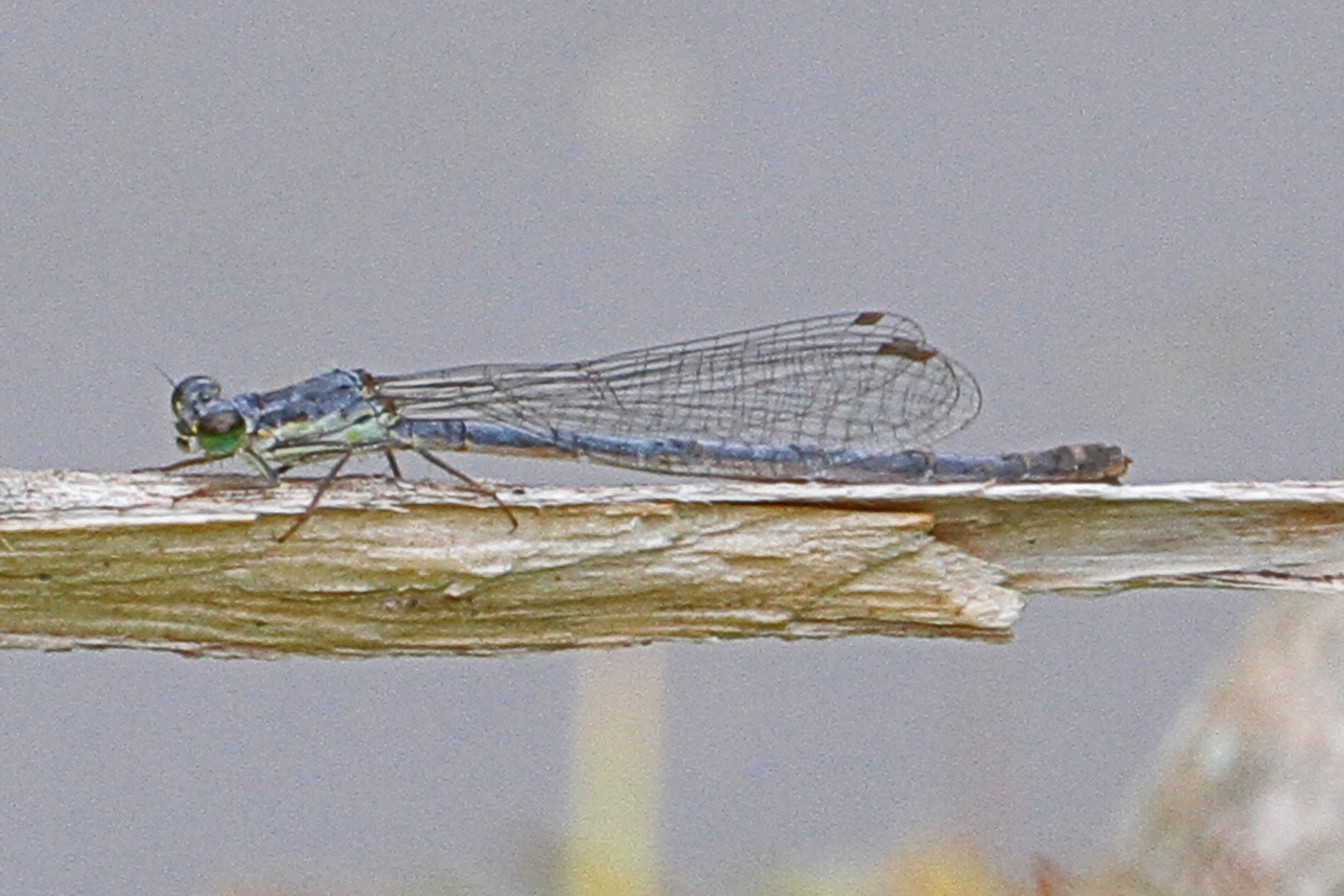
Lilypad forktail, Ischnura kellicotti
