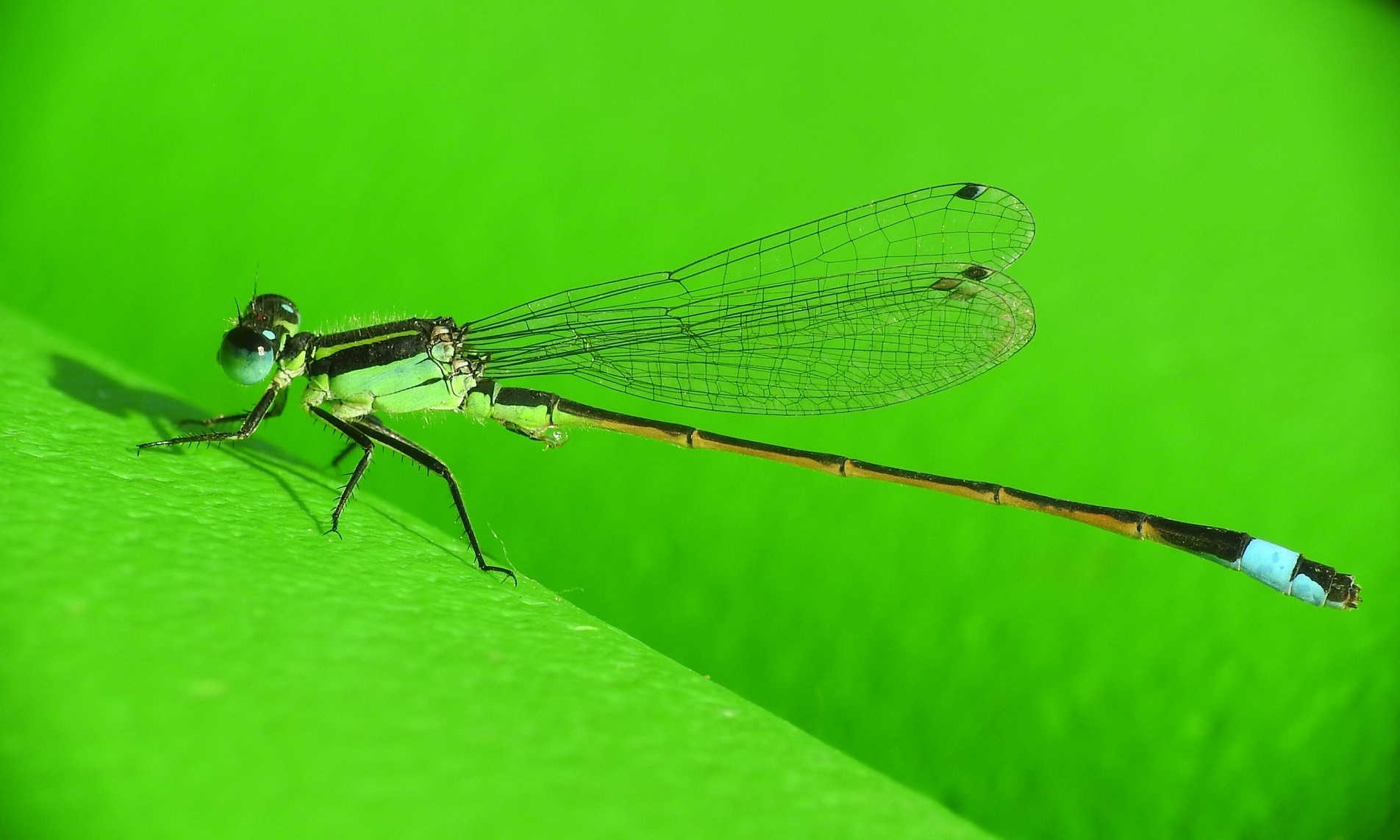
- Male in Florida, USA
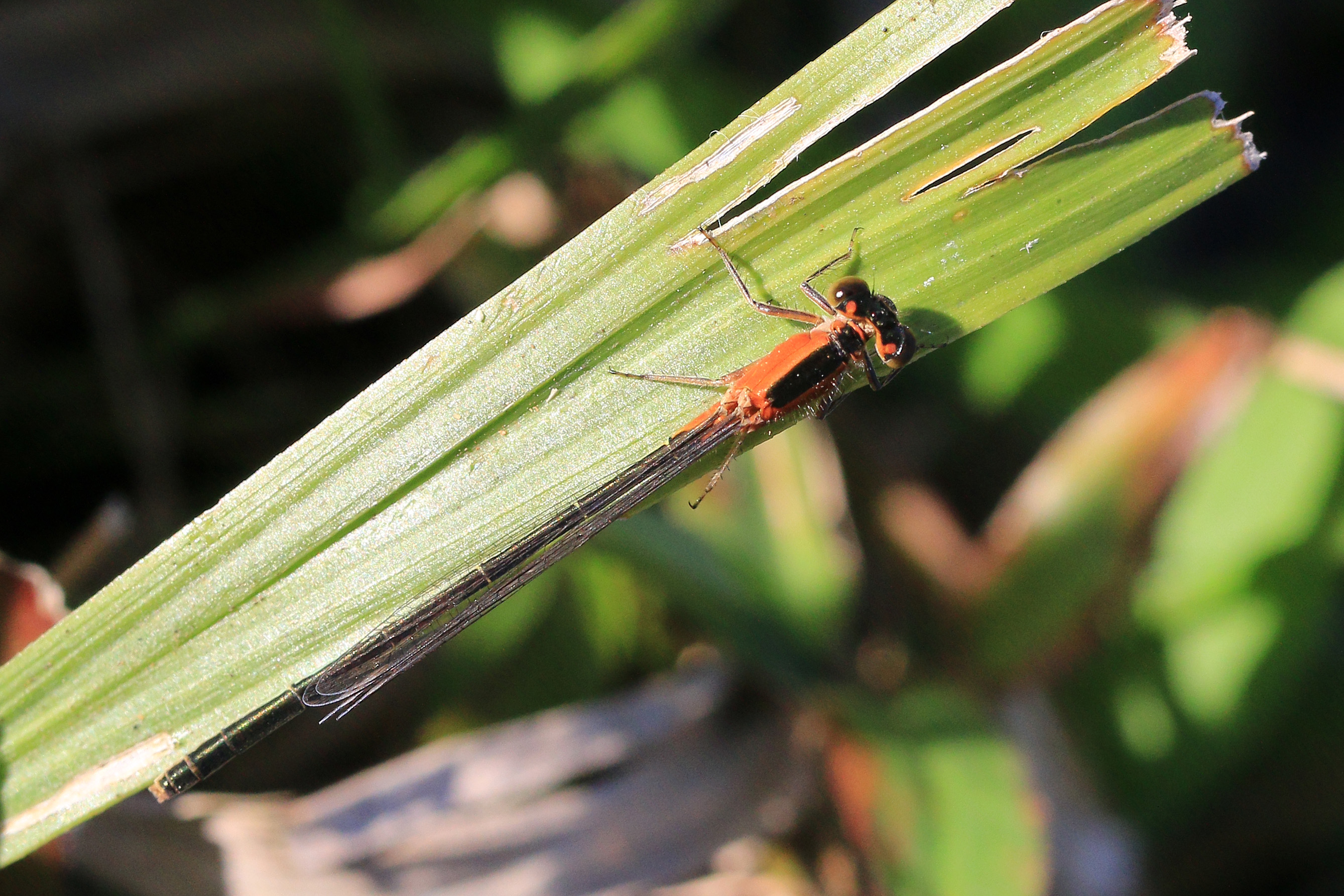
- Female, orange-form Both on Grand Cayman

Conservation status
- Least Concern (IUCN 3.1)

Scientific classification
- Kingdom: Animalia
- Phylum: Arthropoda
- Clade: Pancrustacea
- Class: Insecta
- Order: Odonata
- Suborder: Zygoptera
- Family: Coenagrionidae
- Genus: Ischnura
- Species: I. ramburii

Binomial name
- Ischnura ramburii (Selys, 1850)

Synonyms
- Ischnura credula (Hagen, 1861)

= Rambur's forktail =

Species of damselfly

Rambur's forktail (Ischnura ramburii) is a member of the damselfly family Coenagrionidae. Males are green with blue on abdominal segments 8 and 9. Females are orange-red, olive green, or similar to males in coloration. This is the most widespread New World Ischnura, occurring throughout the Americas from the United States to Chile, as well as Hawaii and the Antilles. The damselfly is a beneficial insect which is a predator of mosquitos and other insects and is not harmful to humans.

== Habitat ==
Ponds, lakes, marshes, and slow streams with vegetation and sunlight are its main habitat. Damselfly nymphs never live in salt water, but I. ramburii nymphs have been observed in brackish and even sulphurous waters.

== Mating ==
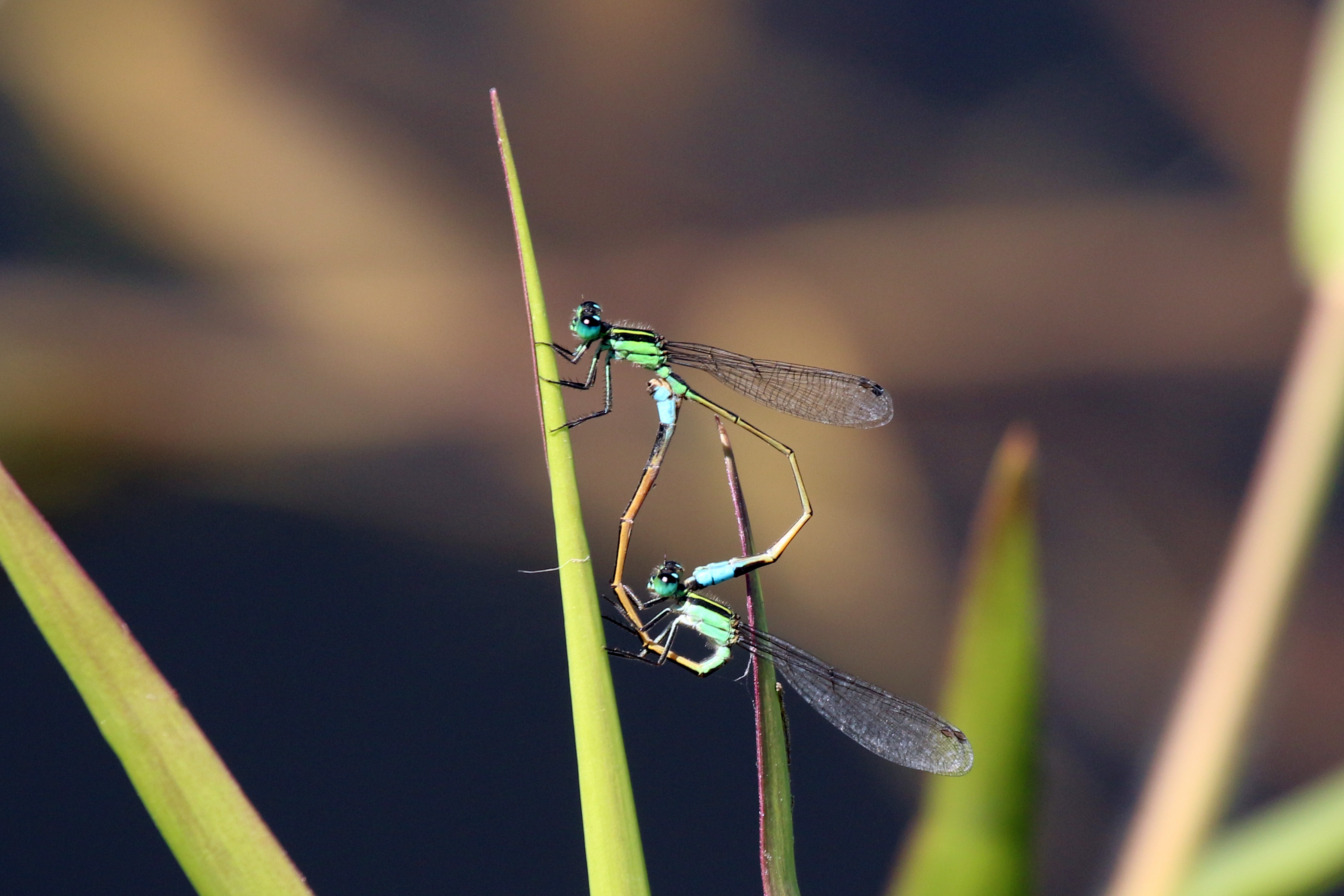
mating female blue form

John Edward Lloyd qualified the mating of this species as "enigmatic": the male grasps the female's head with the terminal appendages of its abdomen while the female seeks and absorbs the sperm with its gonopore. He hypothesised that this "wheel" could have evolved in order to prevent females from escaping during the copulation.

== Etymology ==
Edmond de Sélys Longchamps named this damselfly in honor of Jules Pierre Rambur, an entomologist 12 years his senior. Rambur's collection of insects was one of several that was incorporated into that of Sélys.
