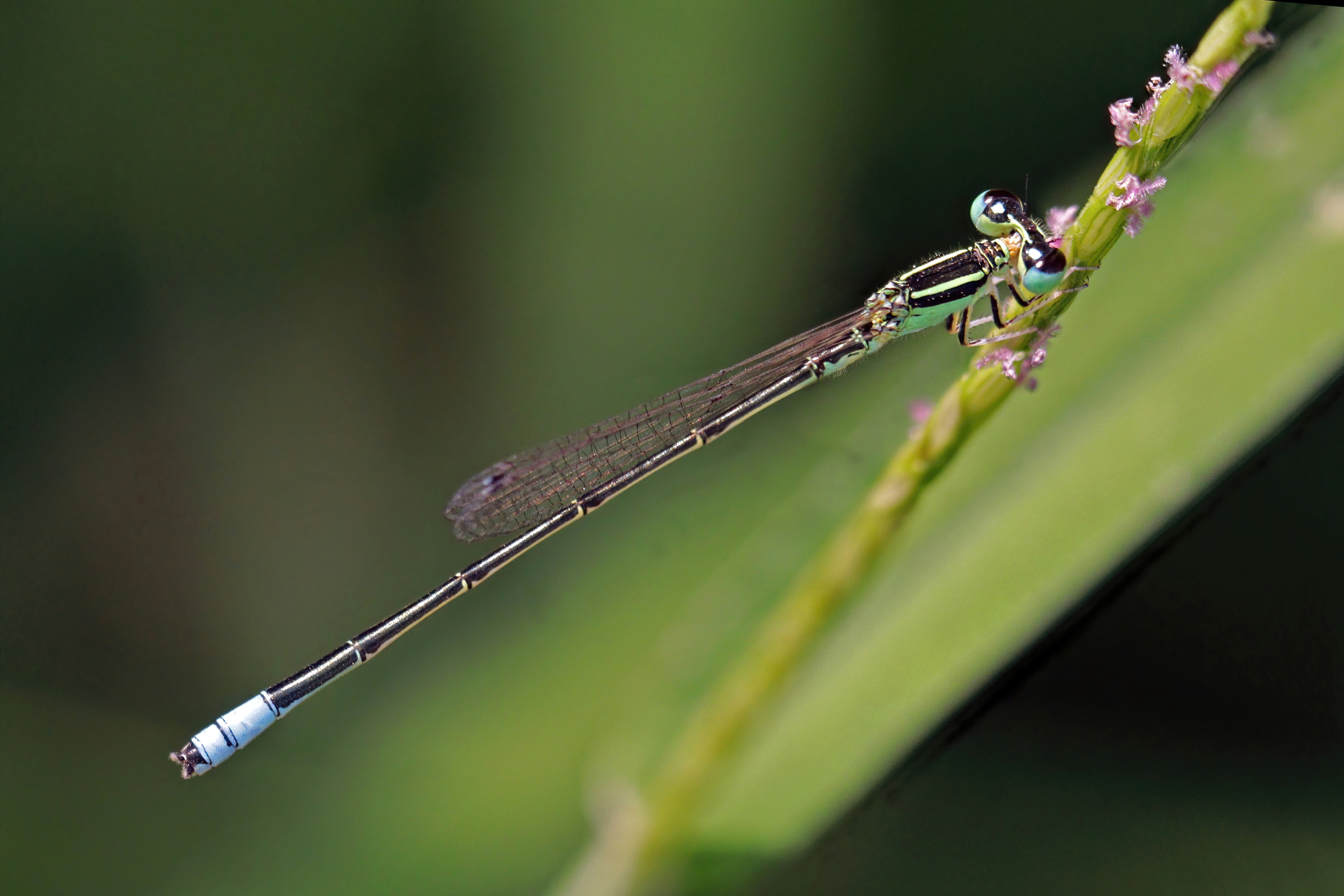
- Mature male
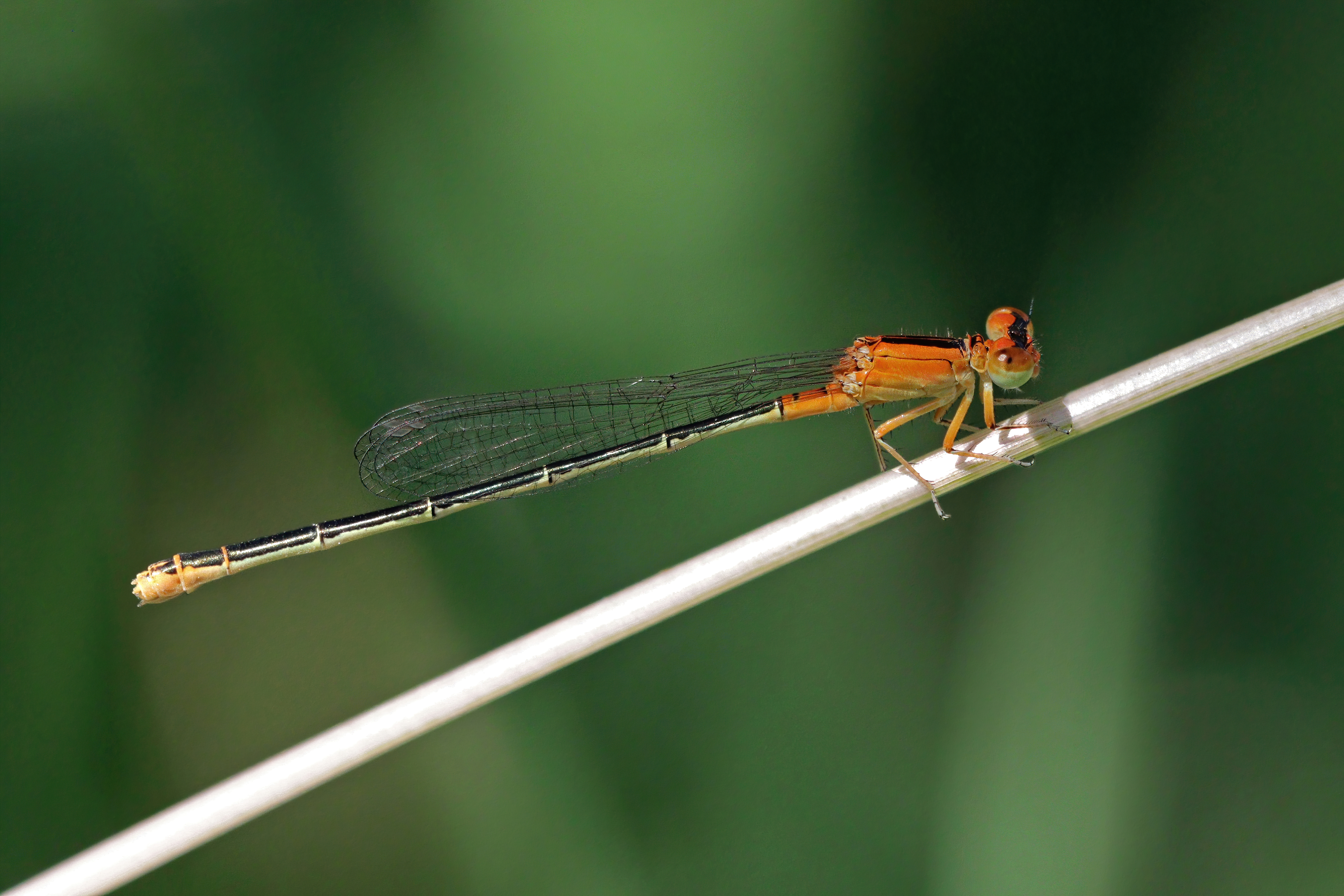
- Immature female, aurantiaca phase

Scientific classification
- Kingdom: Animalia
- Phylum: Arthropoda
- Clade: Pancrustacea
- Class: Insecta
- Order: Odonata
- Suborder: Zygoptera
- Family: Coenagrionidae
- Genus: Ischnura
- Species: I. intermedia

Binomial name
- Ischnura intermedia (Henri J. Dumont, 1974)

= Ischnura intermedia =

Species of damselfly

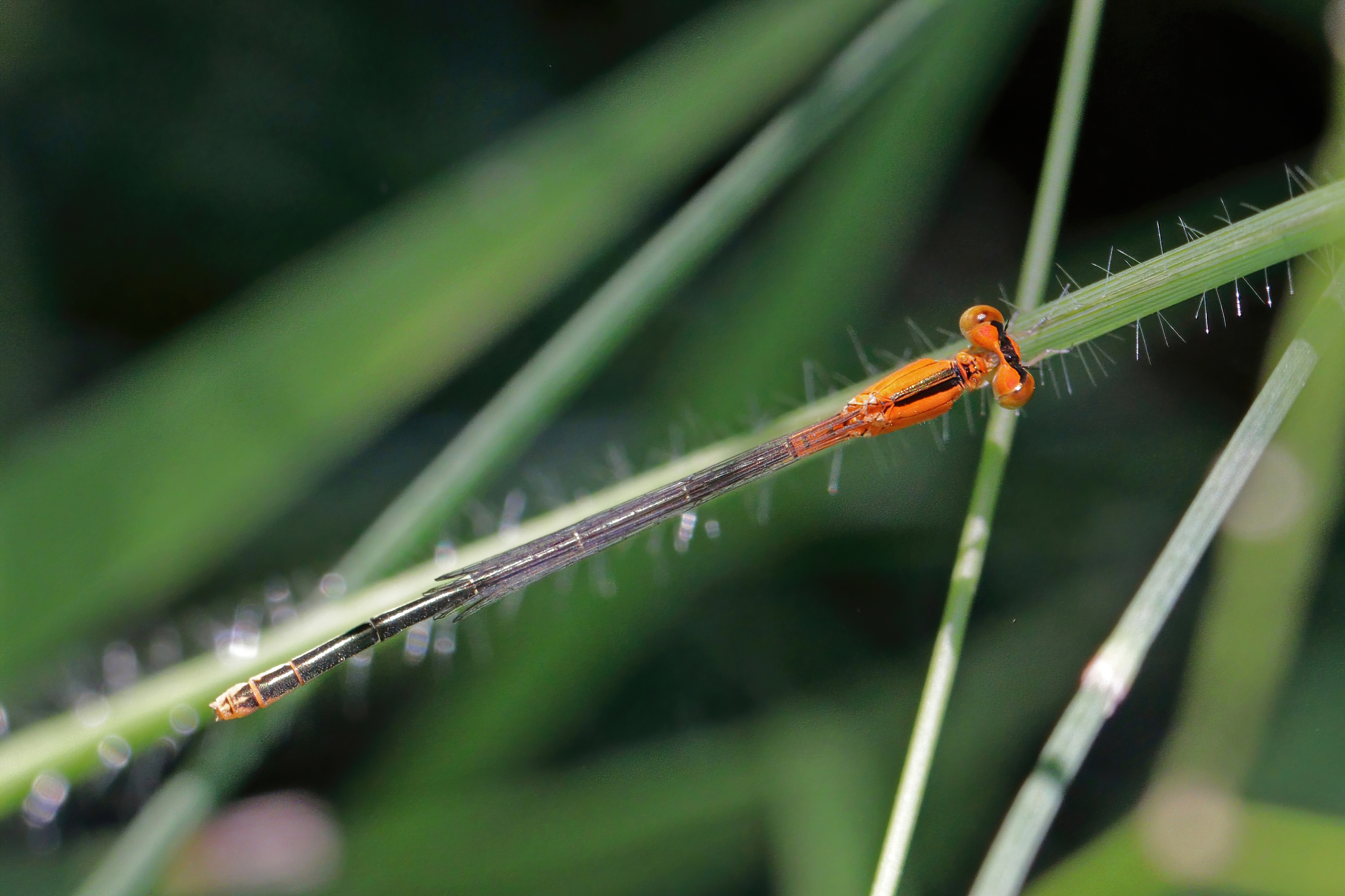
immature female aurantiaca

The Persian damselfly or Dumont's bluetail (Ischnura intermedia) is a damselfly, belonging to the family Coenagrionidae.

== Distribution ==
It was first described in Anatolia, Turkey in 1974 and has been reported from Syria, Iraq, Iran and Turkmenistan. It was discovered in Europe on the island of Cyprus in 2013 and has been recorded at 12 localities in the South West. Globally it is classified as Near-threatened. It has not been evaluated for its conservation status in Europe, but is likely to be Endangered.

== Habitat ==
Permanent slow-flowing streams and channels with localized patches of reeds or other marshy vegetation

== Description ==
Ischnura intermedia can reach a body length of 27–30 millimetres (1.1–1.2 in) and a wingspan of about 18 millimetres (0.71 in). Adult males are similar in size and appearance to I. elegans. Persian blue damselflies have a head and thorax patterned with blue and black. Both sexes have two-toned diamond-shaped pterostigma (wing spots) on the wings which are shorter than I. elegans. The wing spots are smaller on the hindwings. Eyes are blue. Males have a largely black abdomen with very narrow pale markings where each segment joins the next. Segment eight (S8) is entirely pale blue and S9, which is black on I. elegans, is also blue. There is a seasonal variation in the black and blue patterns on S8 and S9. Immature females in the aurantiaca phase have extensive orange colouration on the head, thorax, and the underside of the abdomen. On maturity, the orange colour changes to yellow or green.

== Behavior and flight season ==
I. intermedia is not an active flyer and adults typically rest 10–30 cm above the water. The flight season on Cyprus is from late March till mid-November.
