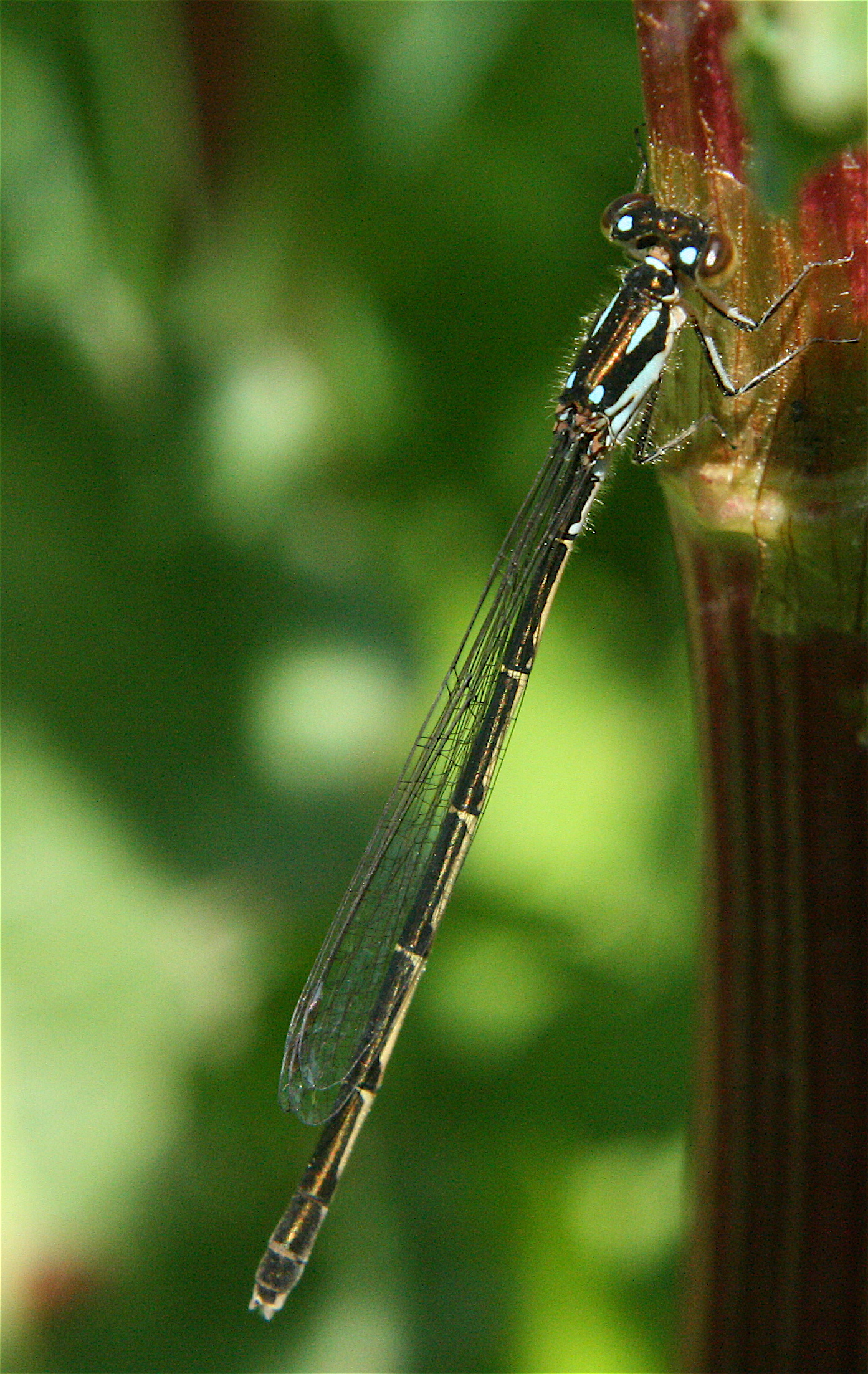

Conservation status
- Least Concern (IUCN 3.1)

- Secure (NatureServe)

Scientific classification
- Kingdom: Animalia
- Phylum: Arthropoda
- Clade: Pancrustacea
- Class: Insecta
- Order: Odonata
- Suborder: Zygoptera
- Family: Coenagrionidae
- Genus: Ischnura
- Species: I. posita

Binomial name
- Ischnura posita (Hagen, 1861)

Subspecies
- I. p. acicularis; I. p. atezca; I. p. posita

= Ischnura posita =

Species of damselfly

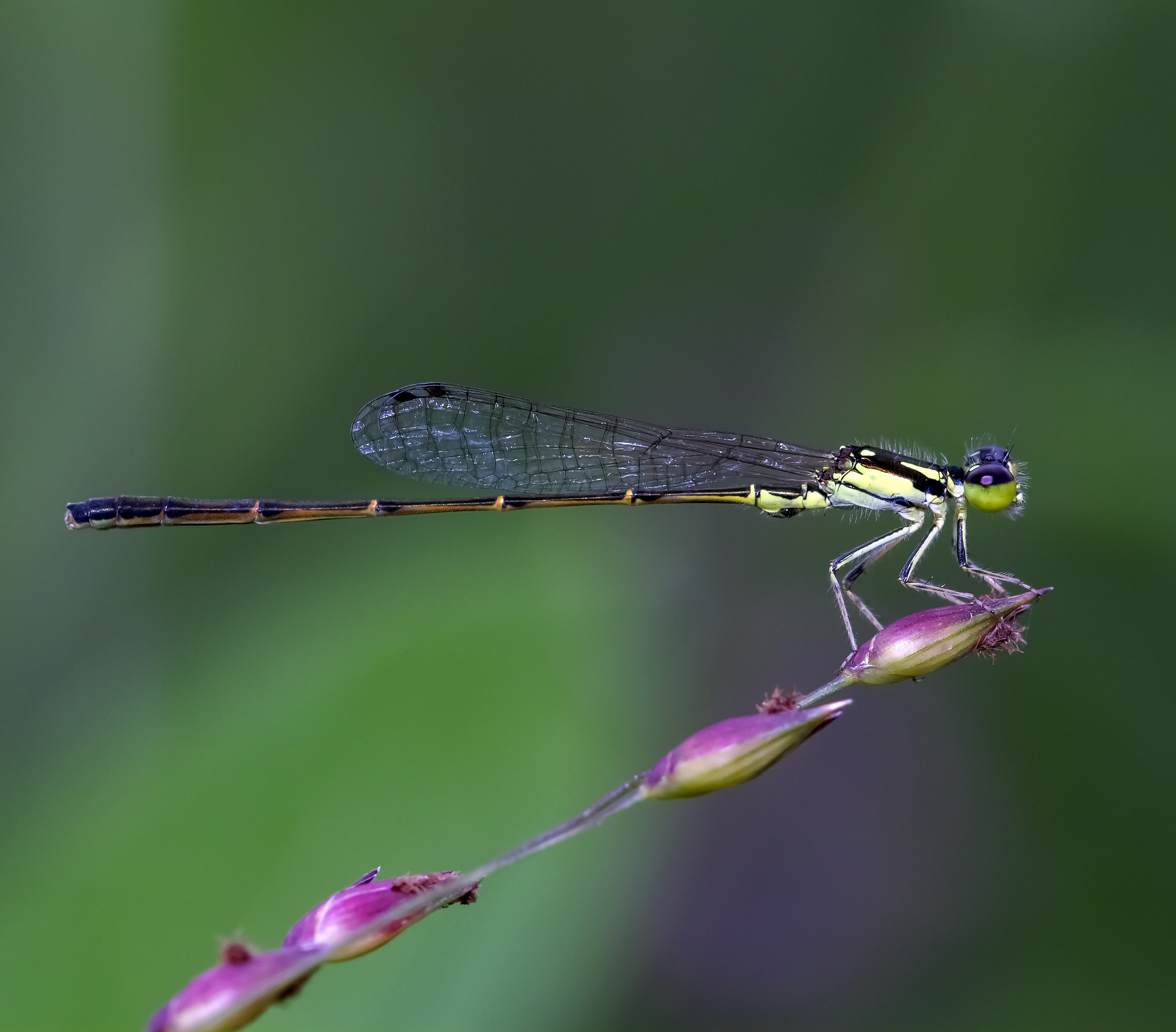
Fragile forktail Ischnura posita

Ischnura posita, the fragile forktail, is a species of damselfly in the genus Ischnura. It is 21 to 29 millimetres (0.83 to 1.14 in) long. It is native to most all of eastern North America.

The shoulder stripes of both sexes resemble exclamation marks. It is one of the more common damselflies on the east coast of the US.
