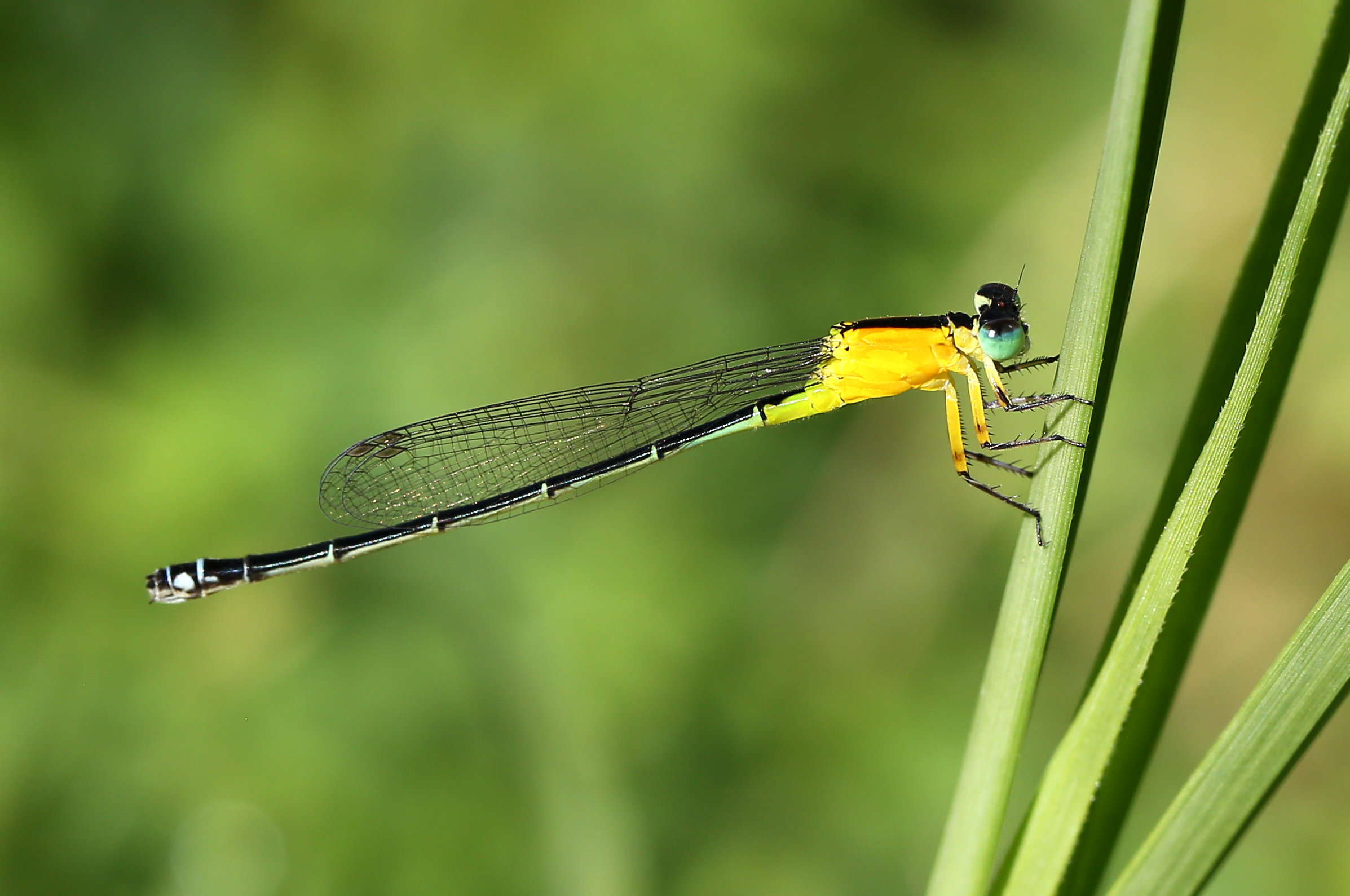
- Female Ischnura pruinescens
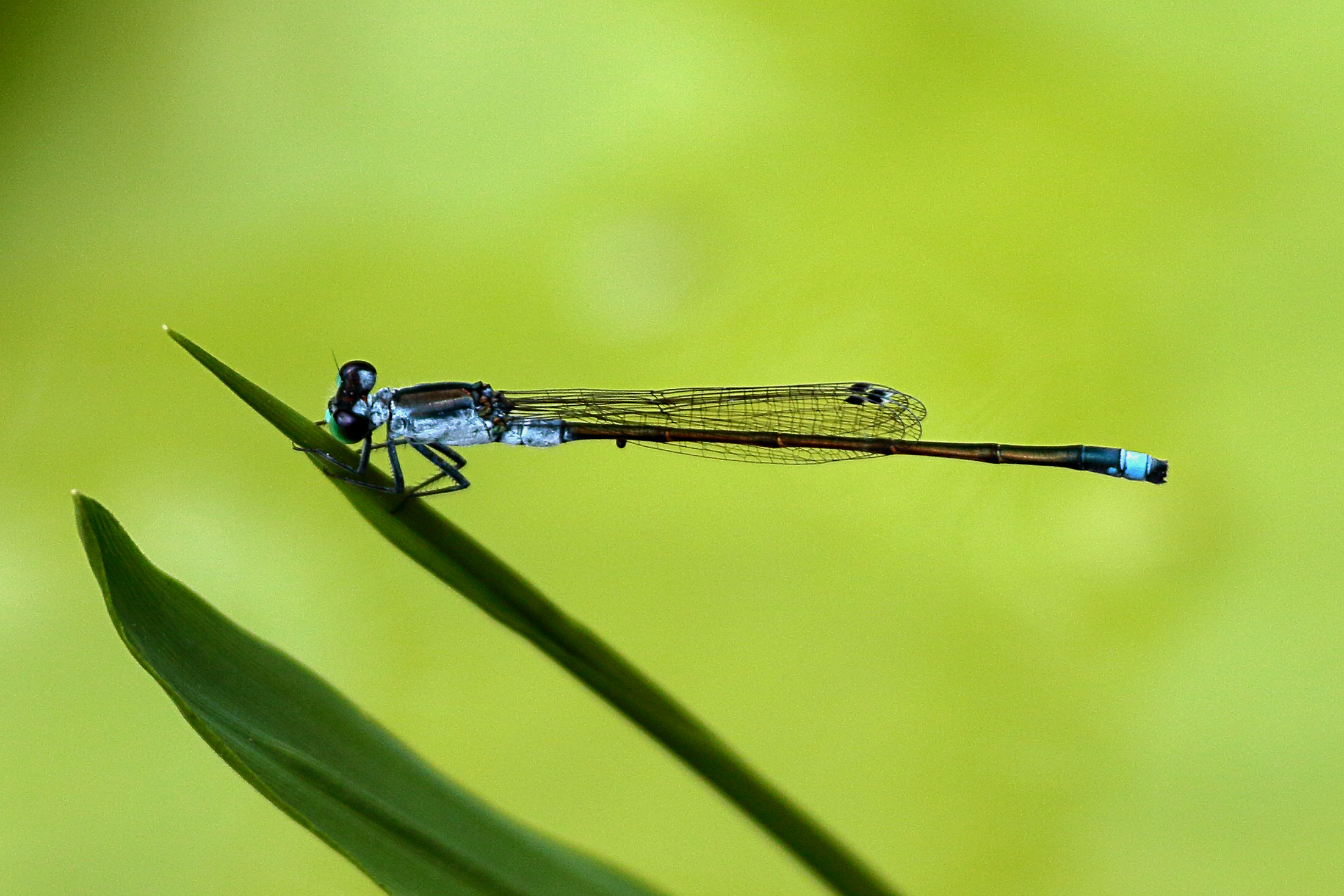
- Male Ischnura pruinescens

Conservation status
- Least Concern (IUCN 3.1)

Scientific classification
- Kingdom: Animalia
- Phylum: Arthropoda
- Clade: Pancrustacea
- Class: Insecta
- Order: Odonata
- Suborder: Zygoptera
- Family: Coenagrionidae
- Genus: Ischnura
- Species: I. pruinescens

Binomial name
- Ischnura pruinescens (Tillyard, 1906)

Synonyms
- Agriocnemis pruinescens Tillyard, 1906

= Ischnura pruinescens =

Species of damselfly

Ischnura pruinescens is a damselfly in the family Coenagrionidae, commonly known as the colourful bluetail. The taxon has been assessed for the IUCN Red List as being of least concern and is listed in the Catalogue of Life.

== Description ==
Ischnura pruinescens is a small to medium-sized damselfly with a wing span around 35 to 50mm. Adult males have a pruinose coating on the synthorax and some of the abdomen. The females have bright yellow or orange on the synthorax and legs, pale green under the abdomen, and blue markings on segments eight and nine.

== Distribution ==
It is found in Australia and New Guinea. The Australian distribution covers the north-eastern segment of the continent, from the Gold Coast to Cape York Peninsula in Queensland and west to the tropical parts of the Northern Territory.

== Habitat ==
The colourful bluetail inhabits freshwater pools, lakes, ponds and swamps.

== Etymology ==
The genus name Ischnura is derived from the Greek ἰσχνός (ischnos, "thin" or "slender") and οὐρά (oura, "tail"), referring to the slender abdomen of species in the genus.

The species name pruinescens is Latin for "becoming frosty", referring to the bluish-grey bloom on the lower thorax and basal segments of the abdomen.

== Gallery ==
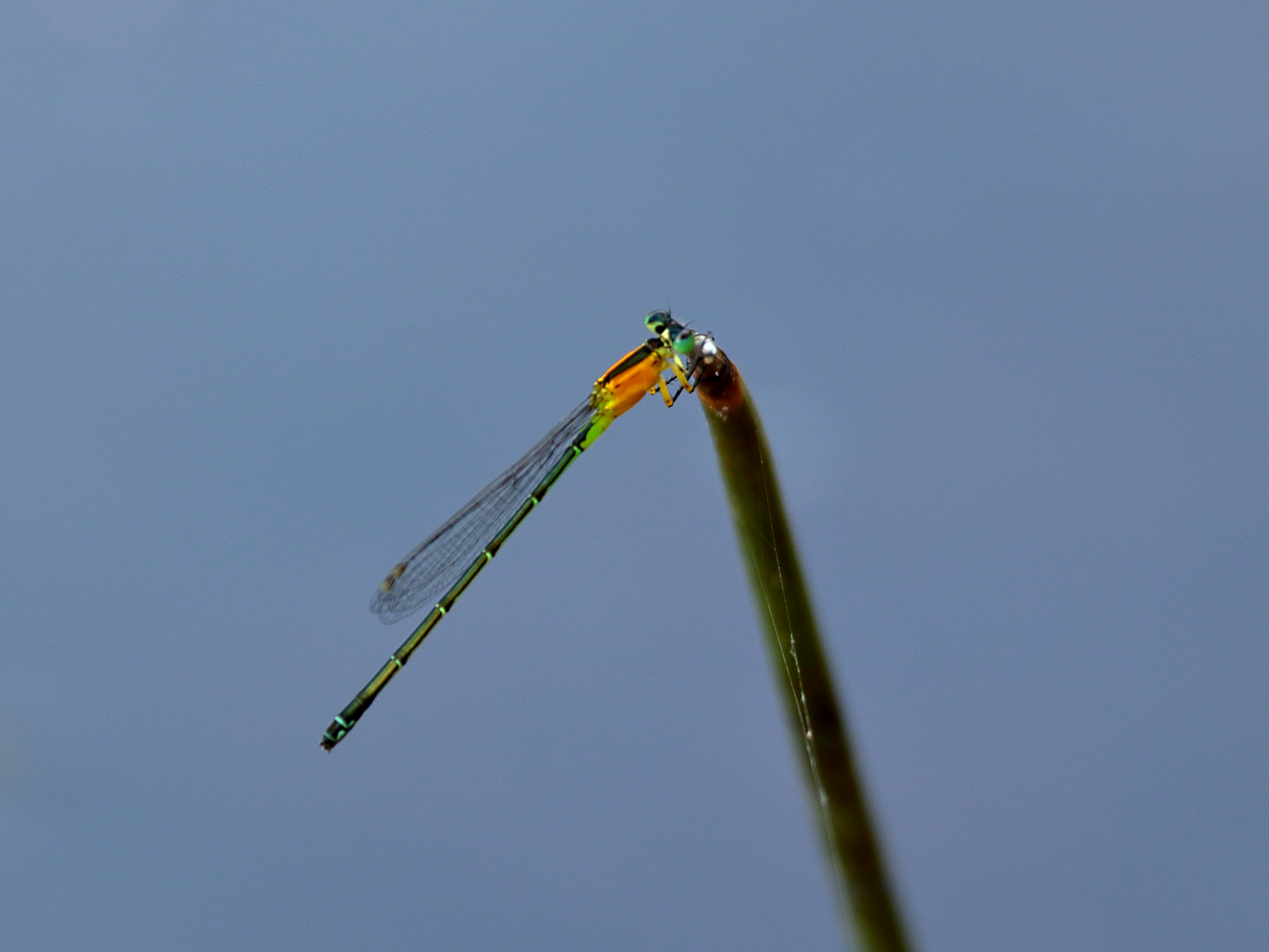
Female

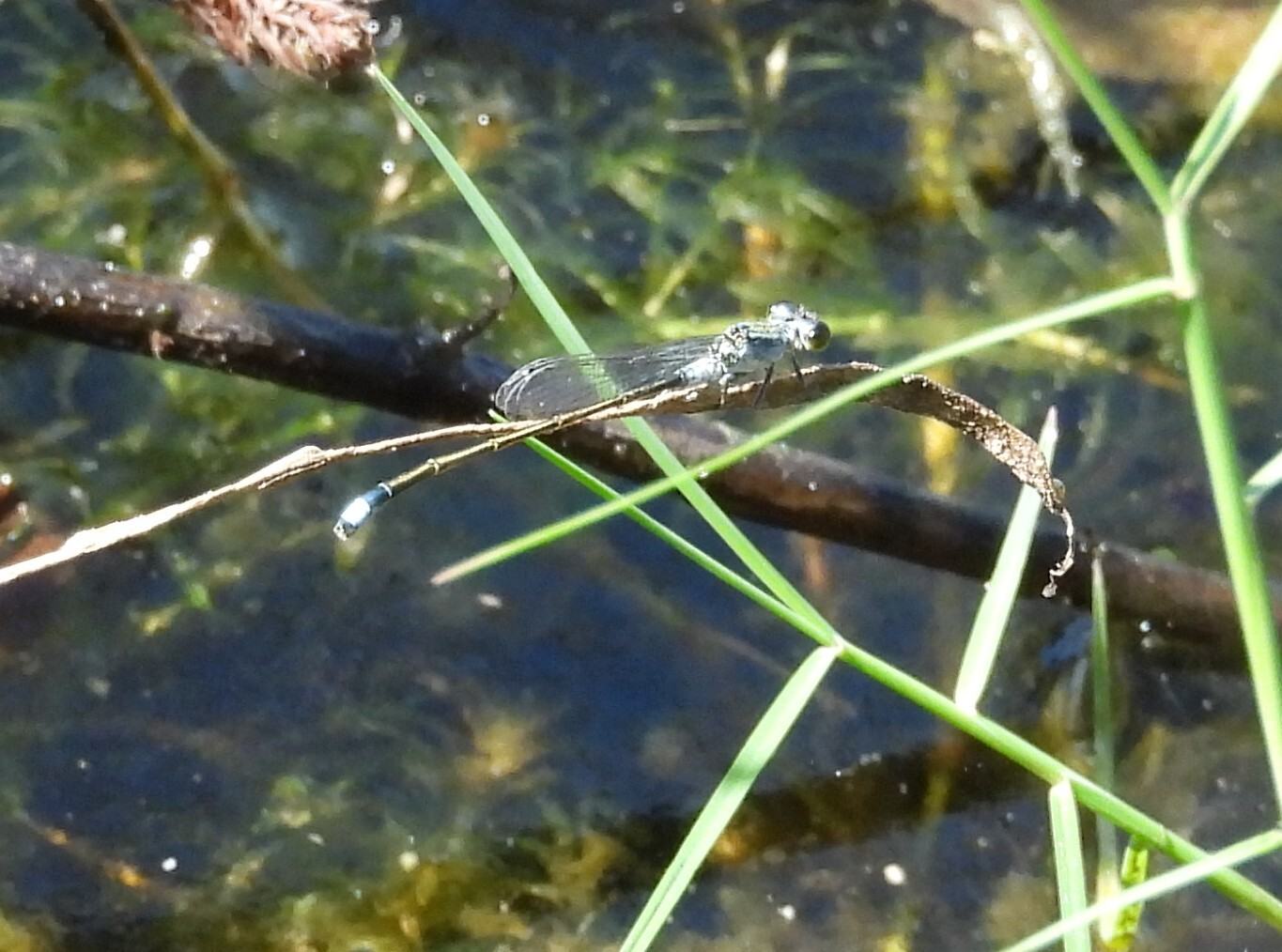
Old male with pruinescence on thorax and tip of tail

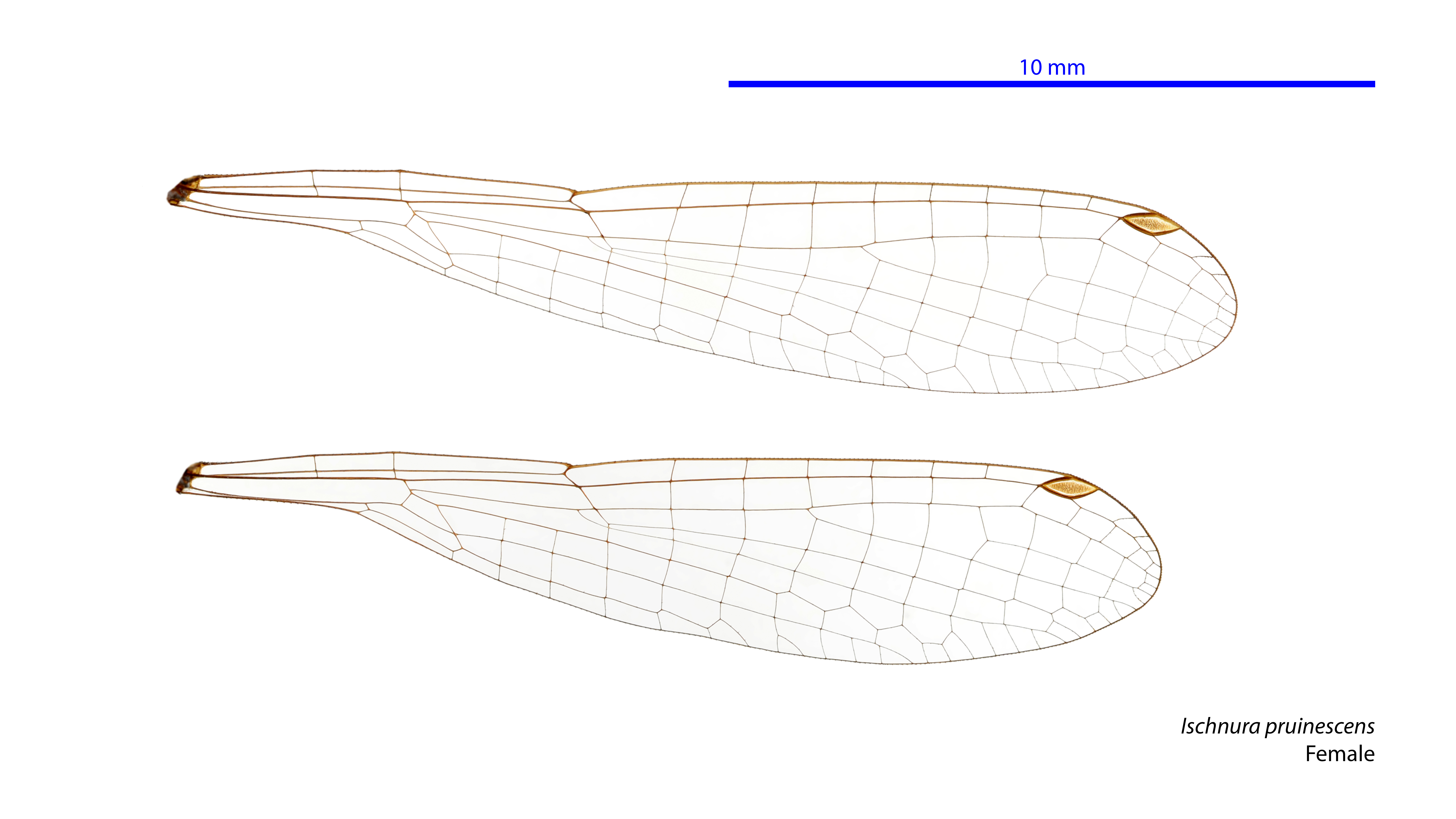
Female wings

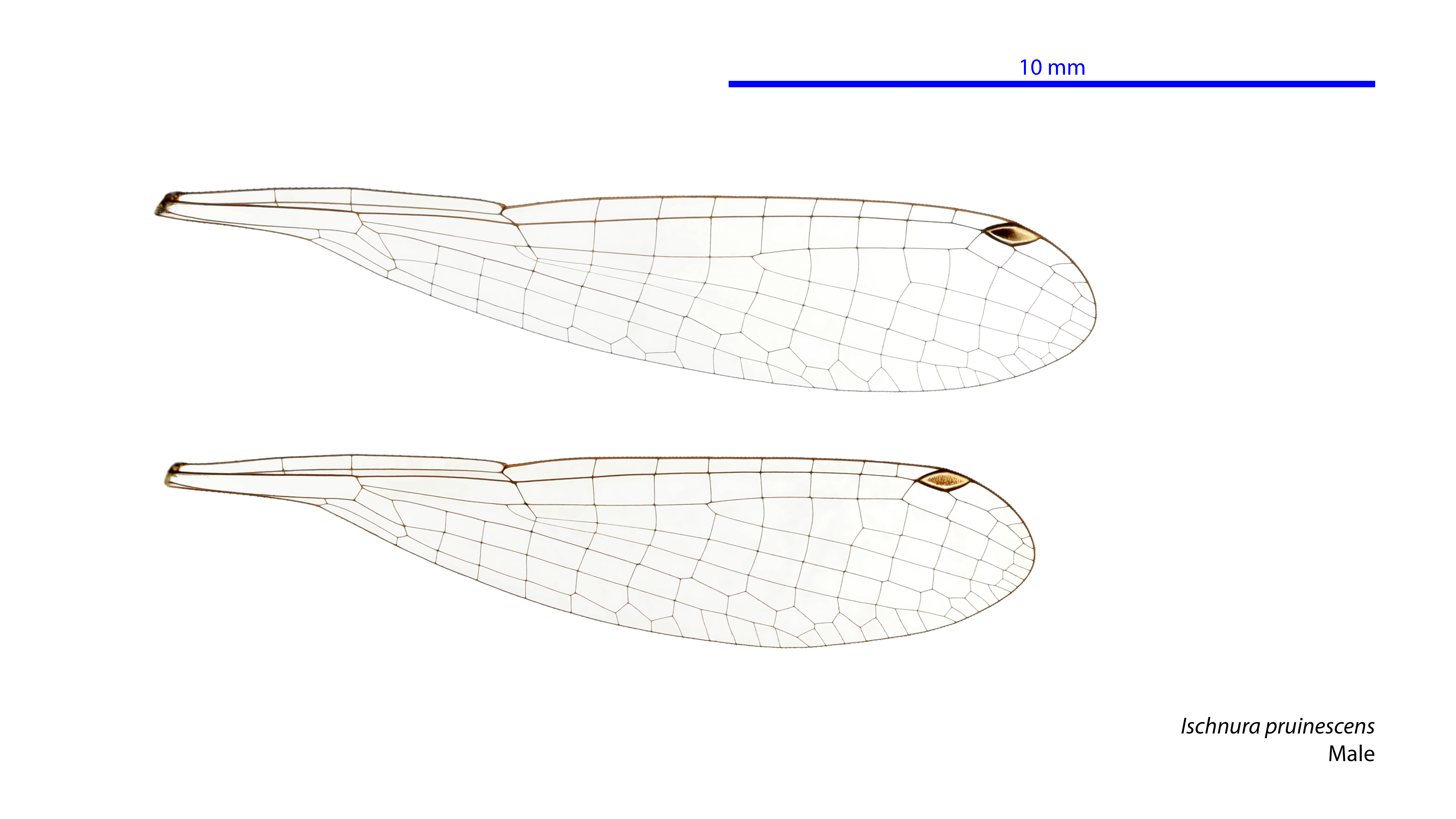
Male wings
