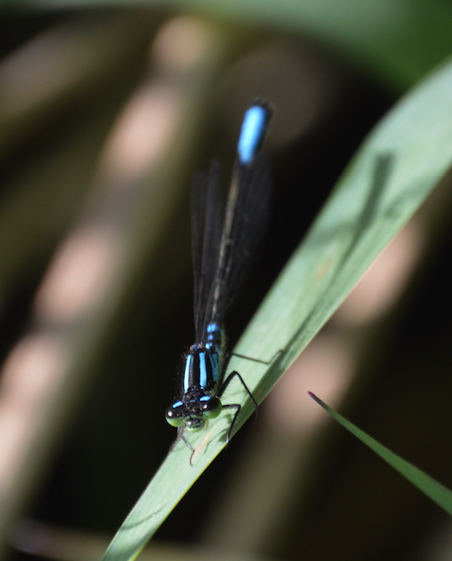

Scientific classification
- Kingdom: Animalia
- Phylum: Arthropoda
- Clade: Pancrustacea
- Class: Insecta
- Order: Odonata
- Suborder: Zygoptera
- Family: Coenagrionidae
- Genus: Ischnura
- Species: I. erratica

Binomial name
- Ischnura erratica Calvert, 1895

= Ischnura erratica =

Species of damselfly

Ischnura erratica, the swift forktail, is a species of damselfly in the family Coenagrionidae. It is native to the Pacific Northwest, ranging from British Columbia to northern California.

== Description ==
Ischnura erratica is a robust species with a length of 30 to 35 mm (1.2 to 1.4 in) and a wingspan of 35 to 40 mm (1.4 to 1.6 in). In the male, the head is black with a green facial stripe and three blue spots on the forehead. The lower part of the eyes are green. The thorax is black dorsally and yellowish-green ventrally, with two lateral blue stripes. The abdomen is shiny black above and yellowish-green or yellowish-orange below. Segments 1 and 2 have blue bands dorsally, segments 3 to 6 have narrow yellow rings and there is a large blue dorsal patch stretching from segments 7 or 8 to segment 10. The tip of segment 10 is extended into an upward-pointing forked tail. The female has two colour phases. One is similar to the male but with duller eyes and greenish-blue replacing blue. The other has pale patches on the head, a greenish thorax, and a black abdomen with narrow green rings at the base of some segments. Immature females have dull orange patches on head and thorax.

== Distribution and habitat ==
Ischnura erratica is native to the Pacific Northwest and is found in lowland and upland habitats in British Columbia, Washington, Oregon and northern California. It breeds in a range of habitats including acid peat bogs, forest lakes, beaver dams, field ponds, ditches and the backwaters of cool streams. It only breeds in clear waters. In British Columbia, it is often associated with drooping woodreed (Cinna latifolia) in the submerged stems of which the eggs are laid. It also perches on lily pads, on rocks and logs and on the ground, with the tip of the abdomen resting on the surface.

== Behavior ==
Ischnura erratica is one of the earliest damselflies to emerge each year. It is on the wing in British Columbia from the very end of April until June or even later, and in California from February to September. It has a rapid low flight and females are sometimes found at long distances from water. The tip of the abdomen may be bent down in flight.

Males defend a small territory in a suitable breeding location beside water. They perch on emerging vegetation and engage in aerial circling with any encroaching male without contact actually being made. Several males may have overlapping territories. They also display by raising the blue tip of the abdomen. Copulation may last for an hour or more but the couple separate before egg-laying starts. The female lays the eggs individually in the stems of submerged water plants, sometimes with her whole abdomen under water.
