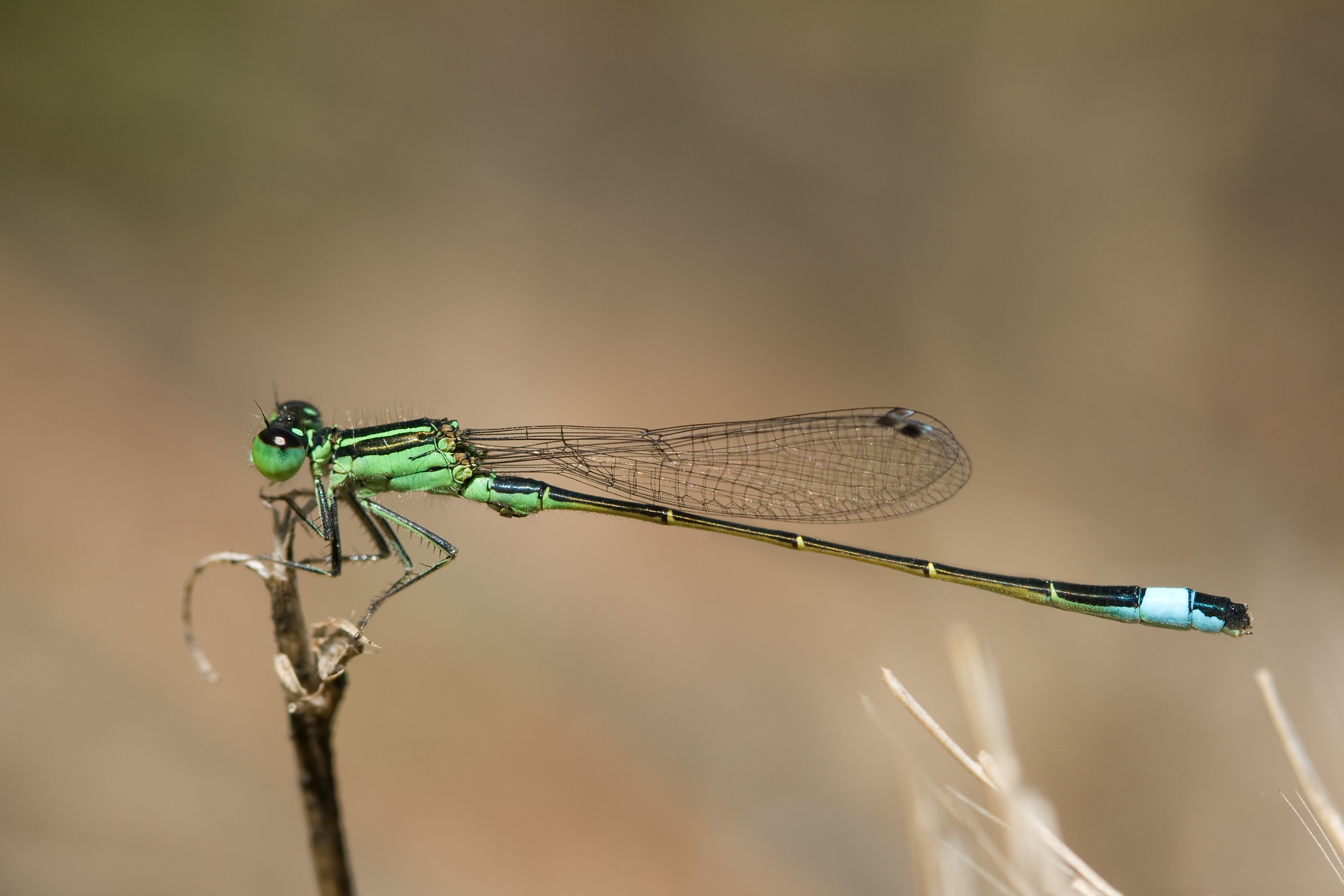
- Male

Scientific classification
- Kingdom: Animalia
- Phylum: Arthropoda
- Clade: Pancrustacea
- Class: Insecta
- Order: Odonata
- Suborder: Zygoptera
- Family: Coenagrionidae
- Genus: Ischnura
- Species: I. genei

Binomial name
- Ischnura genei (Rambur, 1842)

= Ischnura genei =

Species of damselfly

Ischnura genei, the island bluetail damselfly, is a species of damselfly that replaces the blue-tailed damselfly on some Mediterranean islands (e.g., Corsica, Sardinia, and Sicily where the two species are not known to coexist). It is a small and slender damselfly that tends to be smaller and daintier than the common bluetail. Its main distinguishing features include a black abdomen, which in males carries a striking blue tail-light on S8. Some female colour forms, too, have a blue tail-light on S8, but it tends to be interrupted by a black mark on either end. In some other female colour forms S8 is rusty brown. The male's pterostigma is bi-coloured (as it is in Ischnura elegans). In Malta, this species is still frequent and breeds, but it is endangered by habitat loss.
