= Ischnura ezoin =

Conservation status
- Critically Endangered (IUCN 2.3)

Scientific classification
- Kingdom: Animalia
- Phylum: Arthropoda
- Clade: Pancrustacea
- Class: Insecta
- Order: Odonata
- Suborder: Zygoptera
- Family: Coenagrionidae
- Genus: Ischnura
- Species: I. ezoin

Binomial name
- Ischnura ezoin (Asahina, 1952)

Synonyms
- Boninagrion ezoin Asahina, 1952

Species of damselfly

Ischnura ezoin is a species of damselfly in the family Coenagrionidae. It is endemic to Japan.
