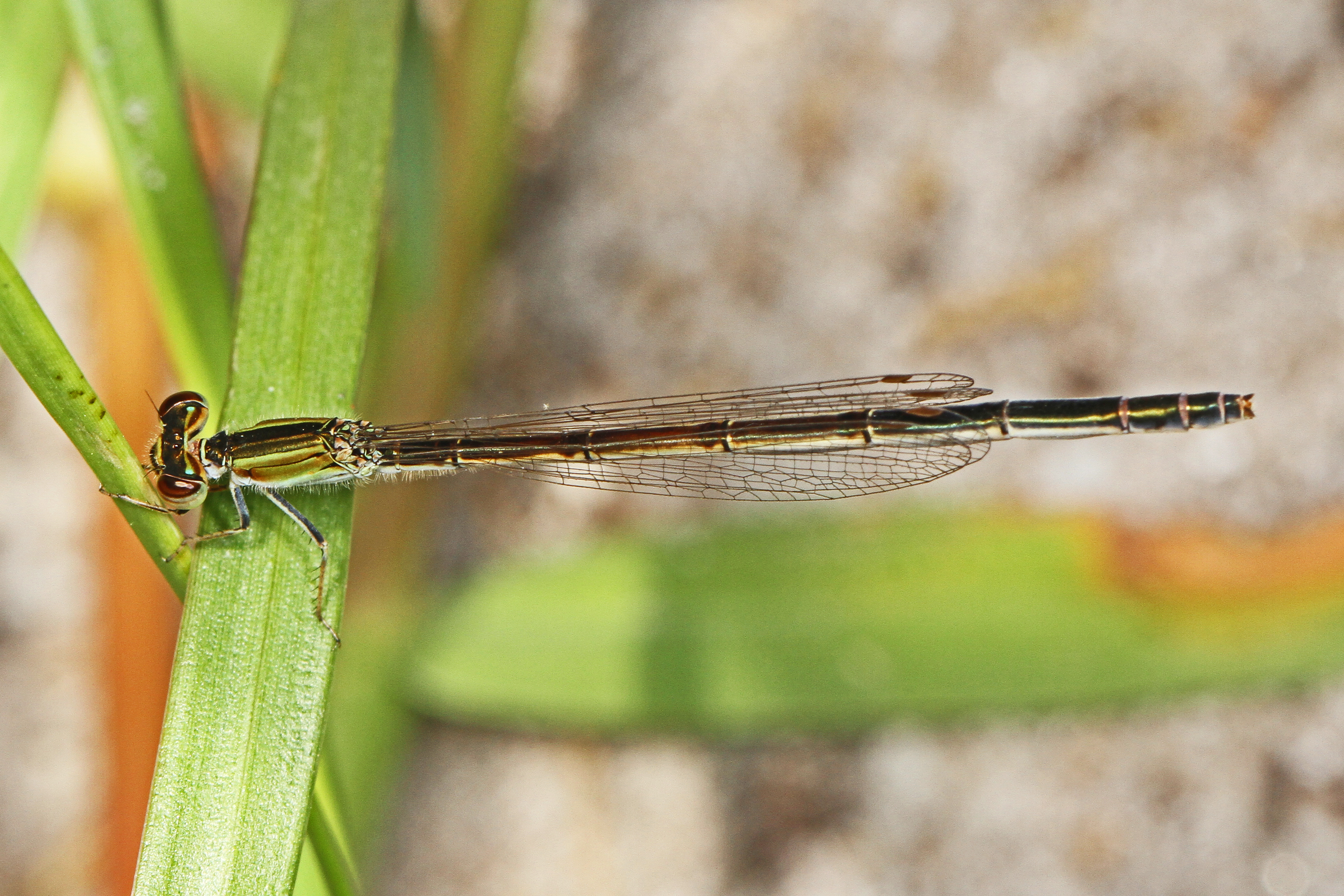

Conservation status
- Least Concern (IUCN 3.1)

Scientific classification
- Kingdom: Animalia
- Phylum: Arthropoda
- Clade: Pancrustacea
- Class: Insecta
- Order: Odonata
- Suborder: Zygoptera
- Family: Coenagrionidae
- Genus: Ischnura
- Species: I. prognata

Binomial name
- Ischnura prognata (Hagen, 1861)

= Ischnura prognata =

Species of damselfly

Ischnura prognata, the furtive forktail, is a species of narrow-winged damselfly in the family Coenagrionidae. It is found in North America.

The IUCN conservation status of Ischnura prognata is "LC", least concern, with no immediate threat to the species' survival. The population is stable.

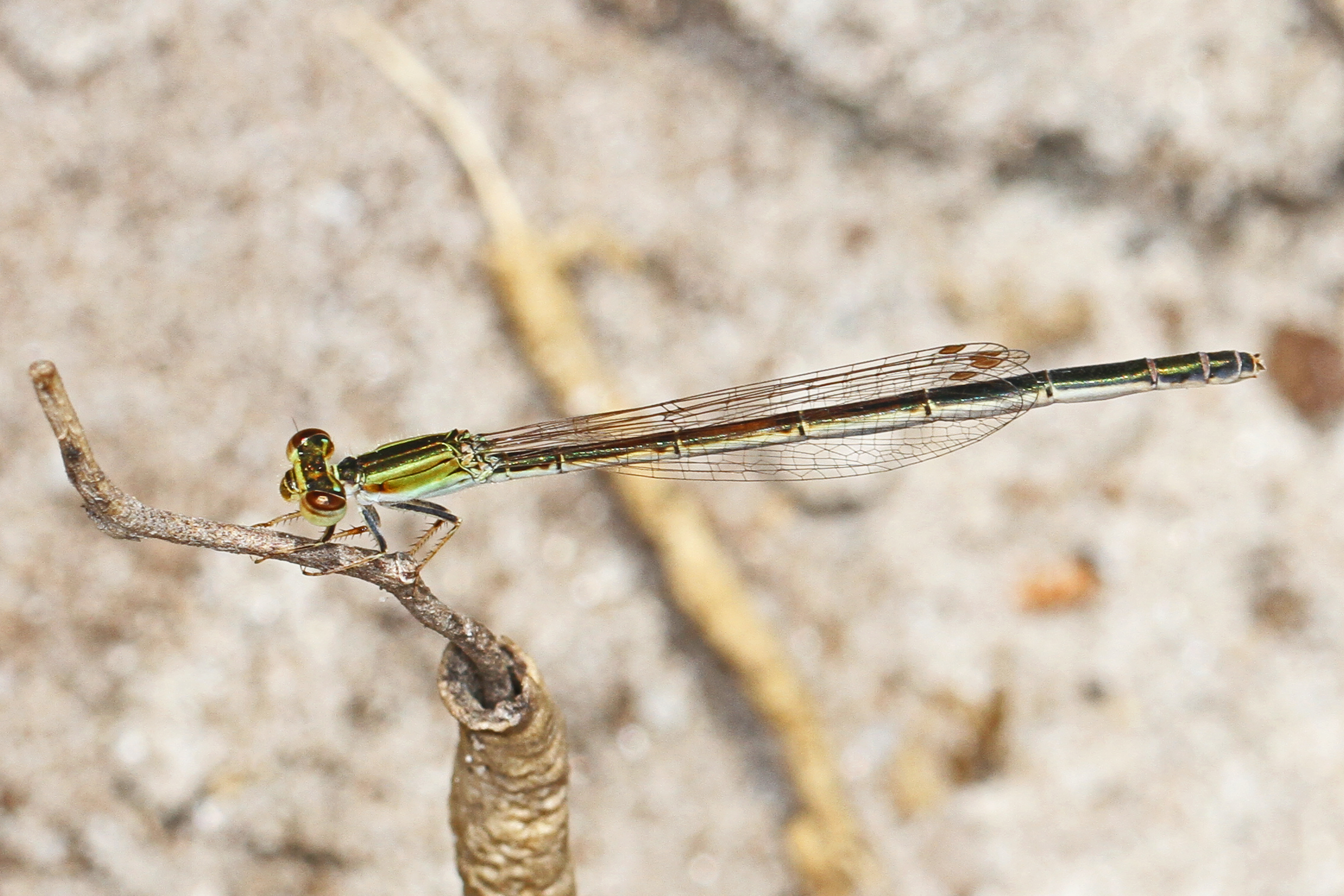
Furtive forktail, Ischnura prognata

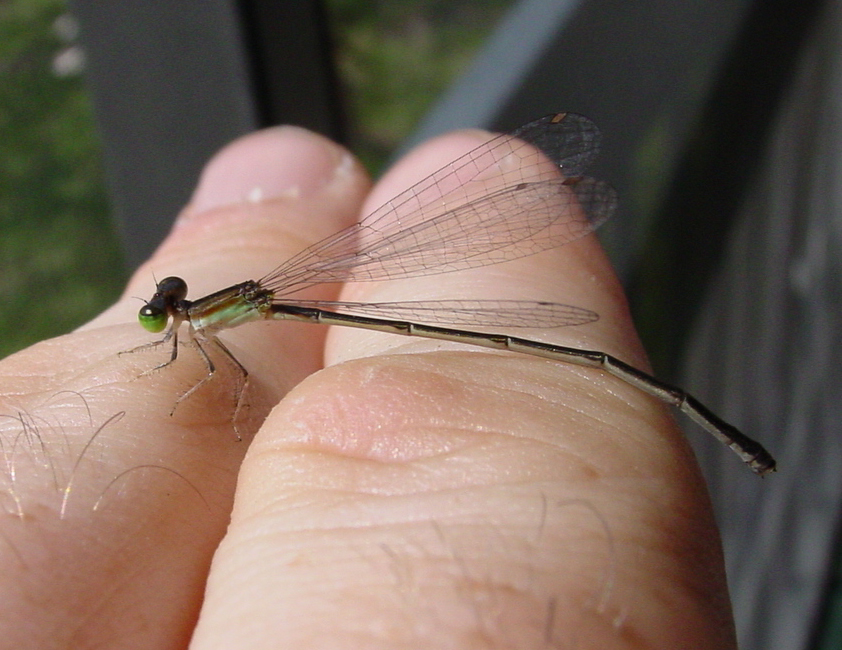
Furtive forktail, Ischnura prognata
