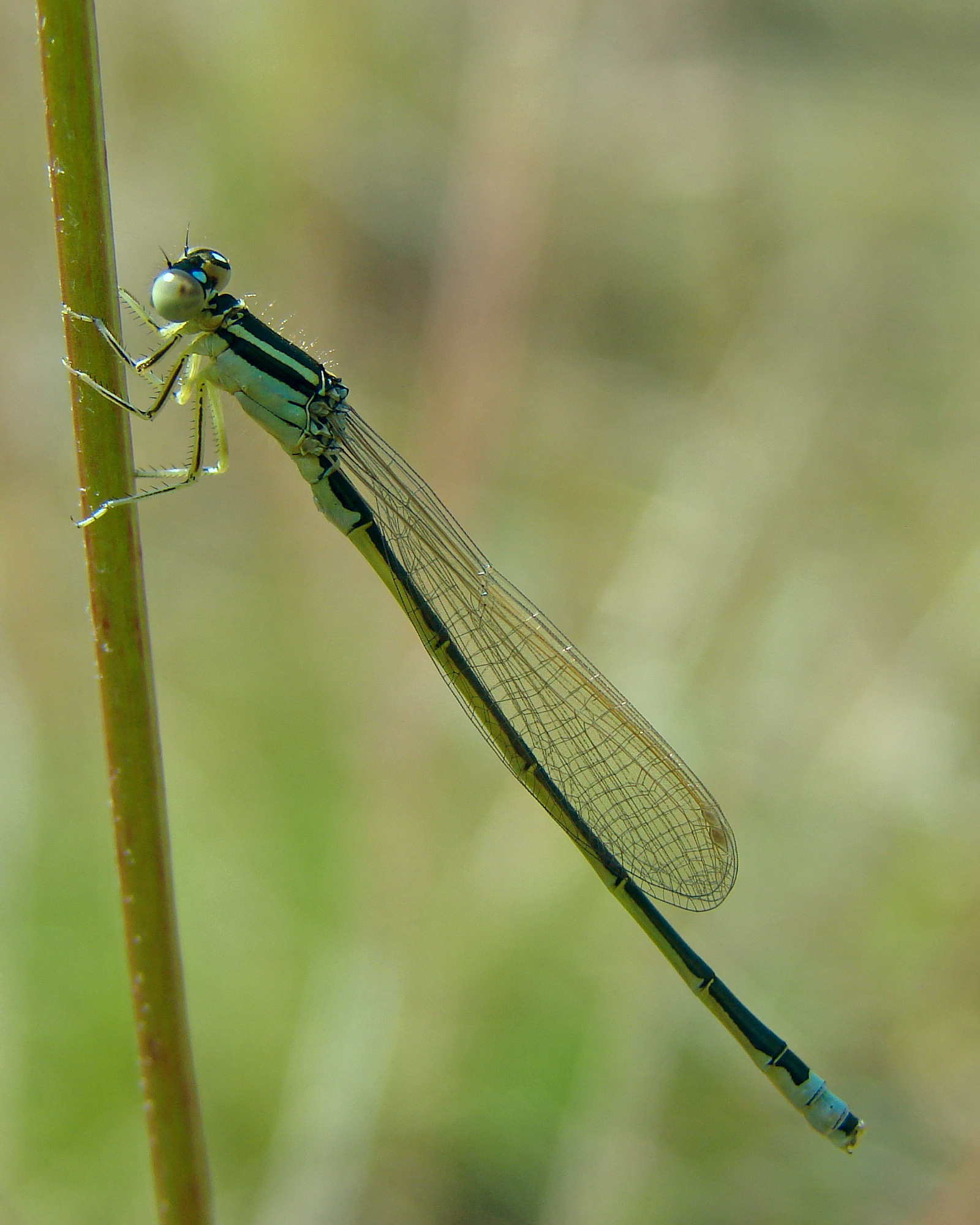
- Male

Scientific classification
- Kingdom: Animalia
- Phylum: Arthropoda
- Clade: Pancrustacea
- Class: Insecta
- Order: Odonata
- Suborder: Zygoptera
- Family: Coenagrionidae
- Genus: Ischnura
- Species: I. pumilio

Binomial name
- Ischnura pumilio (Charpentier, 1825)

= Scarce blue-tailed damselfly =

Species of damselfly

The scarce blue-tailed damselfly or small bluetail (Ischnura pumilio) is a member of the damselfly family Coenagrionidae.

Mature female

The species occurs throughout Europe except in the north. To the east it occurs from Asia Minor to Siberia, to the south the range extends to Morocco, the Azores and Madeira. The typical male has a black abdomen with a bright blue spot on tail (segments 8 and 9). It is very similar to the blue-tailed damselfly, Ischnura elegans but on that species the blue spot is mostly on segment 8. Females undergo a change of colour as they mature. The immature female is bright orange, the aurantiaca phase, but matures to a greenish-brown.
