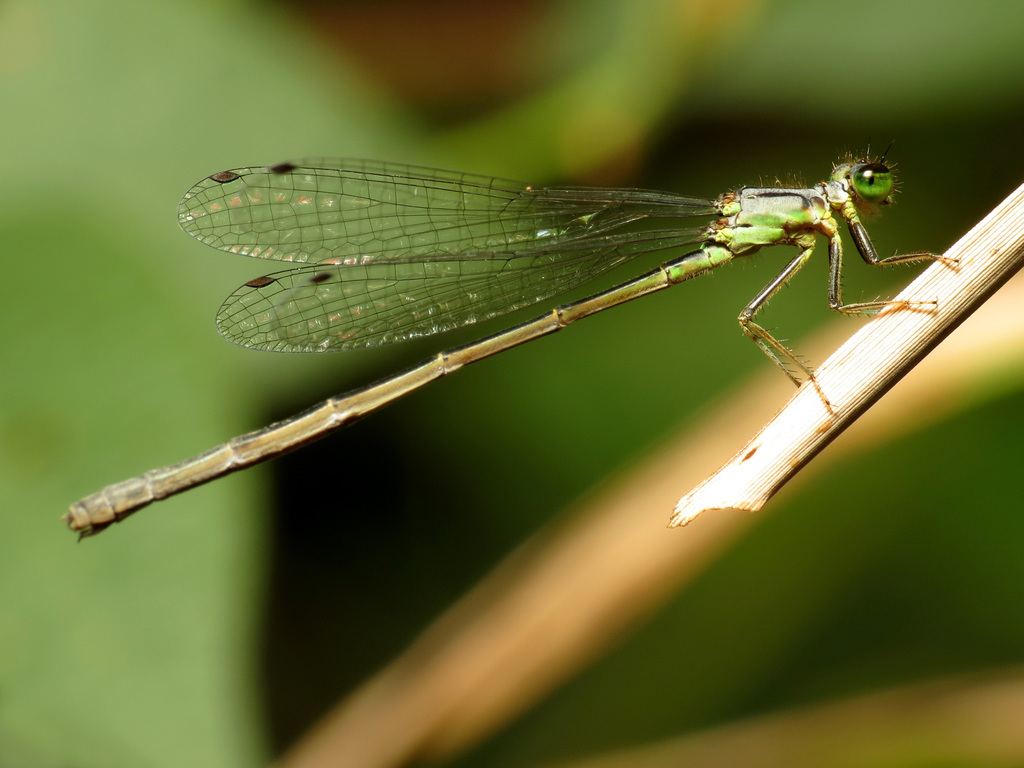

Conservation status
- Least Concern (IUCN 3.1)

Scientific classification
- Kingdom: Animalia
- Phylum: Arthropoda
- Clade: Pancrustacea
- Class: Insecta
- Order: Odonata
- Suborder: Zygoptera
- Family: Coenagrionidae
- Genus: Ischnura
- Species: I. demorsa

Binomial name
- Ischnura demorsa (Hagen, 1861)

= Ischnura demorsa =

Species of damselfly

Ischnura demorsa is a damselfly in the genus Ischnura ("forktails"), in the family Coenagrionidae ("narrow-winged damselflies"). The species is known generally as the "Mexican forktail". The distribution range of Ischnura demorsa includes Central America and North America.

The IUCN conservation status of Ischnura demorsa is "LC", least concern, with no immediate threat to the species' survival. The population is stable.
