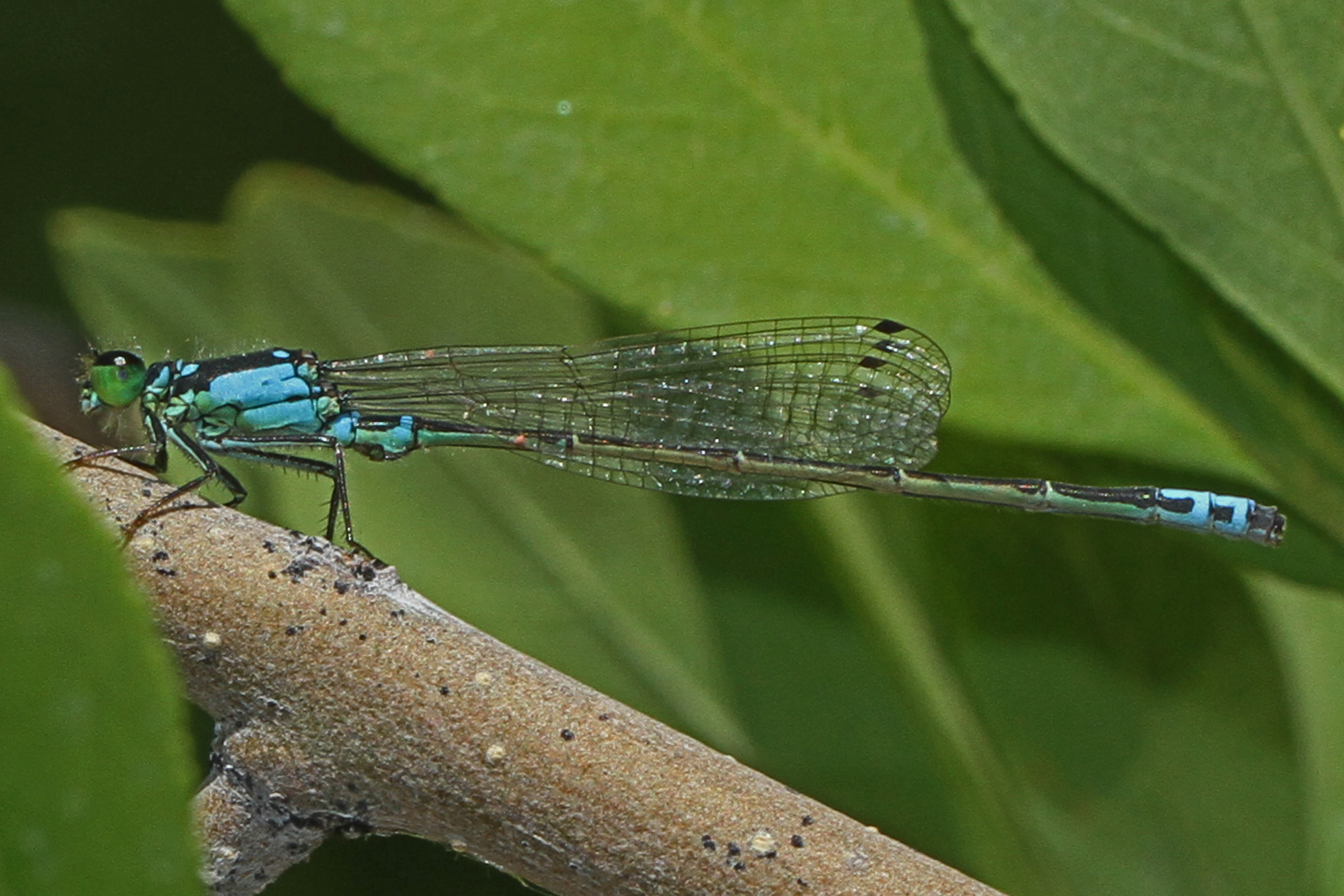

Conservation status
- Least Concern (IUCN 3.1)

Scientific classification
- Kingdom: Animalia
- Phylum: Arthropoda
- Clade: Pancrustacea
- Class: Insecta
- Order: Odonata
- Suborder: Zygoptera
- Family: Coenagrionidae
- Genus: Ischnura
- Species: I. damula

Binomial name
- Ischnura damula Calvert, 1902

= Ischnura damula =

Species of damselfly

Ischnura damula, the plains forktail, is a species of narrow-winged damselfly in the family Coenagrionidae. It is found in North America.

The IUCN conservation status of Ischnura damula is "LC", least concern, with no immediate threat to the species' survival. The population is stable.
