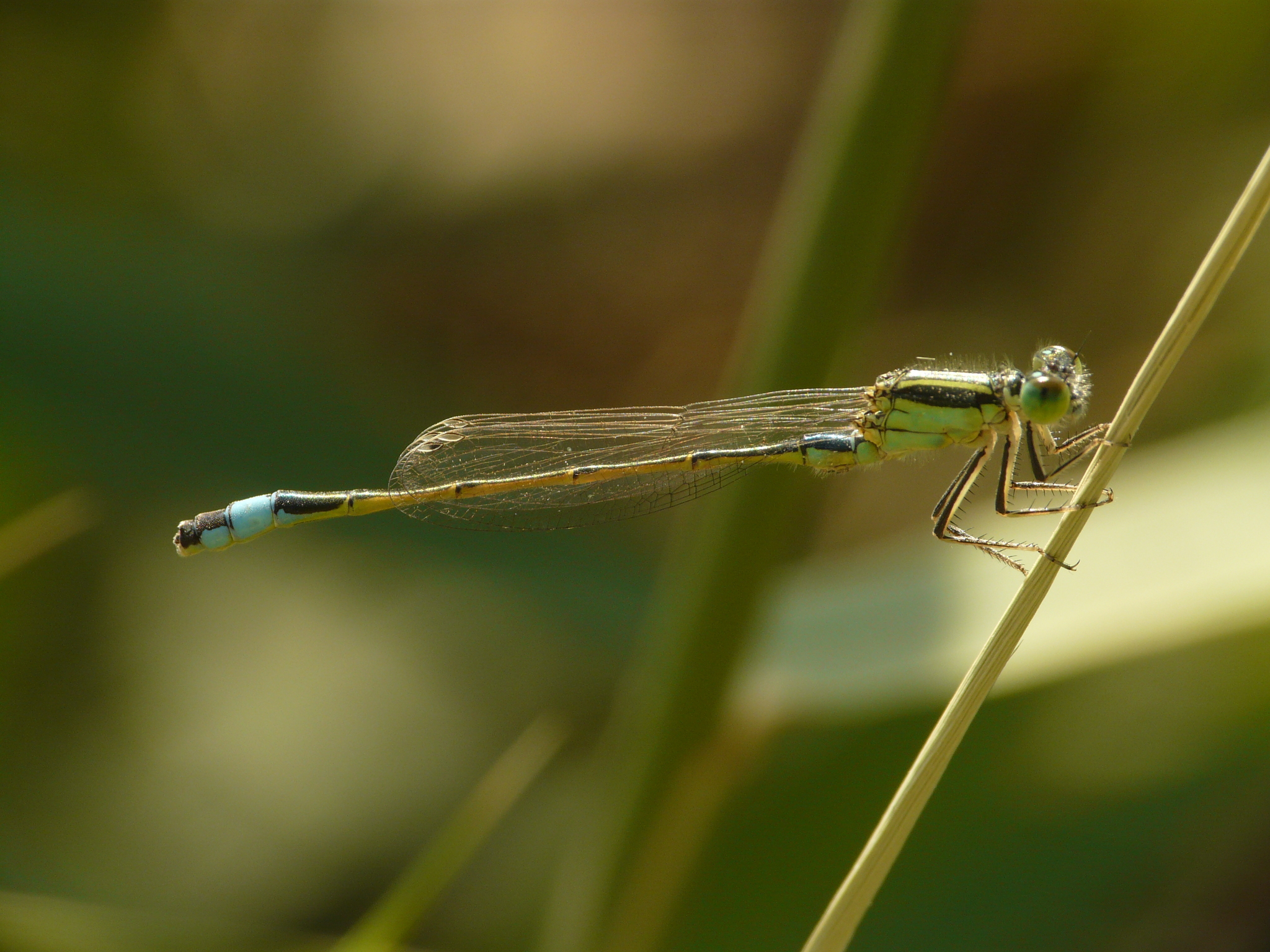
- Male in Israel

Scientific classification
- Kingdom: Animalia
- Phylum: Arthropoda
- Clade: Pancrustacea
- Class: Insecta
- Order: Odonata
- Suborder: Zygoptera
- Family: Coenagrionidae
- Genus: Ischnura
- Species: I. evansi

Binomial name
- Ischnura evansi Morton, 1919

= Ischnura evansi =

Species of damselfly

Ischnura evansi, commonly known as the desert bluetail, is a species of damselfly in the family Coenagrionidae. It is a desert-dwelling species distributed from Egypt eastwards through the Middle East and the Arabian Peninsula to Central Asia.

== Description ==
Ischnura evansi is a small, slender damselfly with a characteristic green-and-black coloration. Identification within the genus Ischnura can be challenging and often relies on subtle morphological details.

The most diagnostic feature of males is the pattern on the second abdominal segment (S2). When viewed laterally, the border between the green and black coloration forms a straight line. Another key character is the shape of the anal appendages, which do not extend beyond the tip of the abdomen. Additional useful traits include a small lobe protruding from the pronotum and a dark pterostigma bordered by pale edges. Most males display green-and-black body colors with broad antehumeral stripes, though some individuals are blue-and-black with narrower stripes, resembling the Oasis bluetail, Ischnura fountaineae.

Females are even more difficult to identify and are often recognized through association with males. Two main female morphs are as follows:

- The andromorph form displays male-like coloration (green, or rarely blue) with the ninth abdominal segment (S9) blue; immature individuals are often violet.
- The gynomorph form may appear pinkish, reddish, yellowish, or brownish. Eye coloration is variable, ranging from green to blue or red.

== Ecology ==
The main flight period extends from March to June, although some adults may be observed year-round.

Remarkably, Ischnura evansi is the only known migratory species within the genus Ischnura, a rare behavior among damselflies in general. Migrations are nocturnal.

== Distribution ==
The species occurs patchily across arid regions from Egypt and Sudan through the Levant, the Arabian Peninsula, Iraq, along the Persian Gulf, and southern Iran, extending into Central Asia. Within this range it is common in suitable desert habitats and is considered one of the most widespread damselflies on the Arabian Peninsula. Between March and April, adults migrate northward and can occasionally appear in gardens or irrigated areas.

== Habitat ==
Ischnura evansi primarily inhabits desert environments. Its larvae tolerate brackish water and occur in wadis, springs, oases, irrigation channels, marshes, and saline desert pools with aquatic vegetation. Owing to its ecological preferences, it is frequently found alongside related species such as Ischnura senegalensis and Ischnura fountaineae.

== Gallery ==
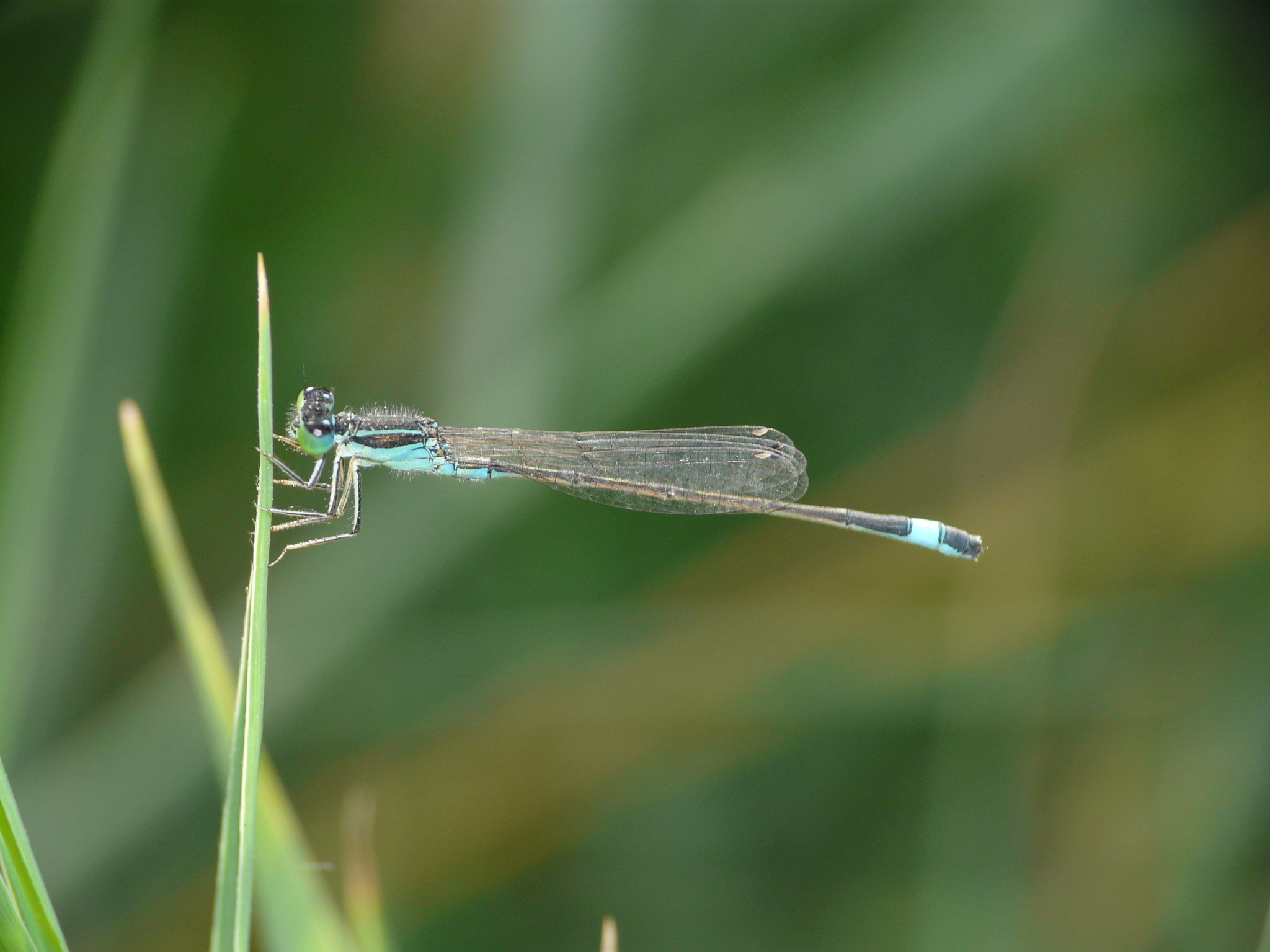
Male, Egypt – note the straight border on abdominal segment S2

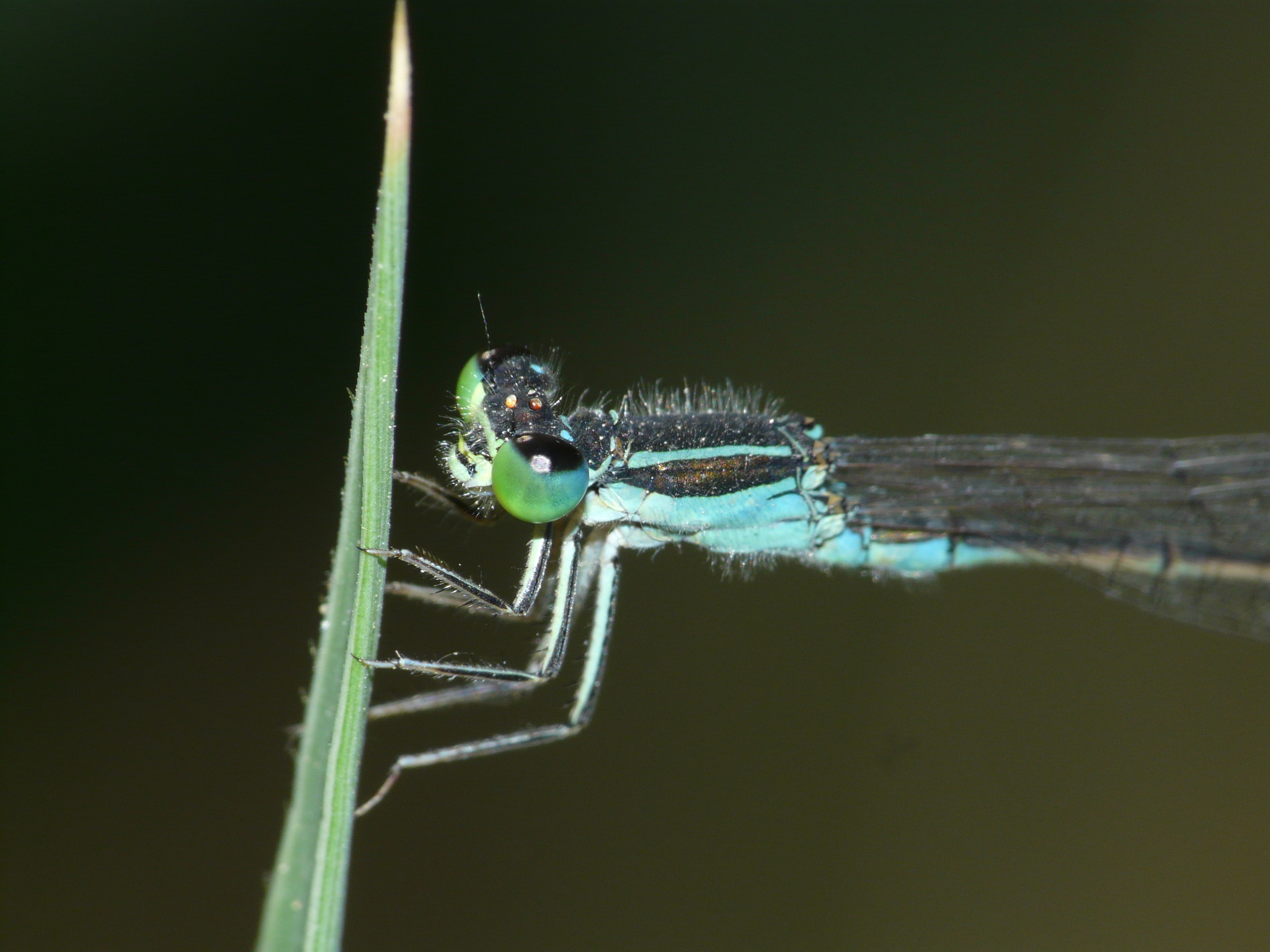
Close-up of a male head, Egypt

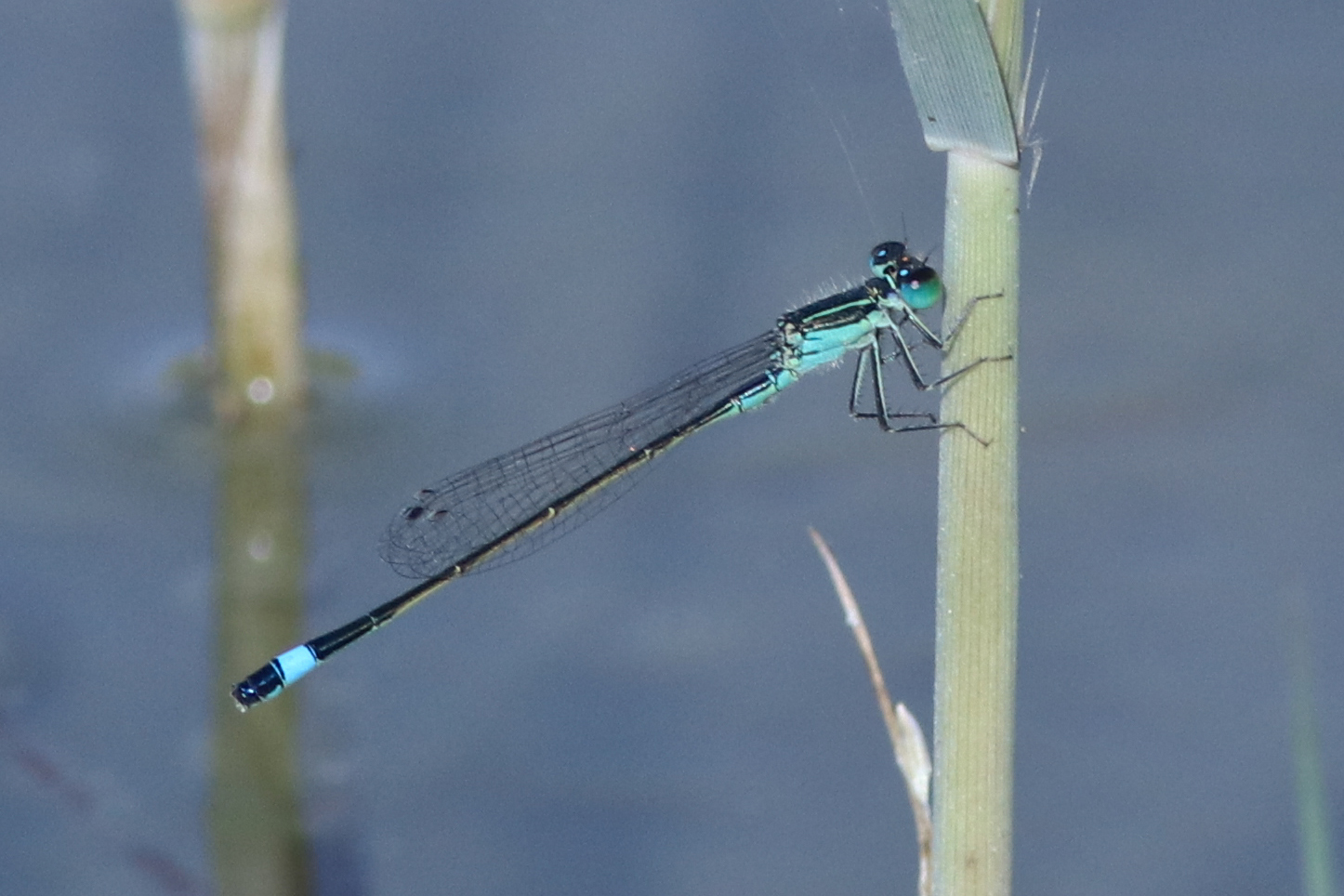
Male, United Arab Emirates

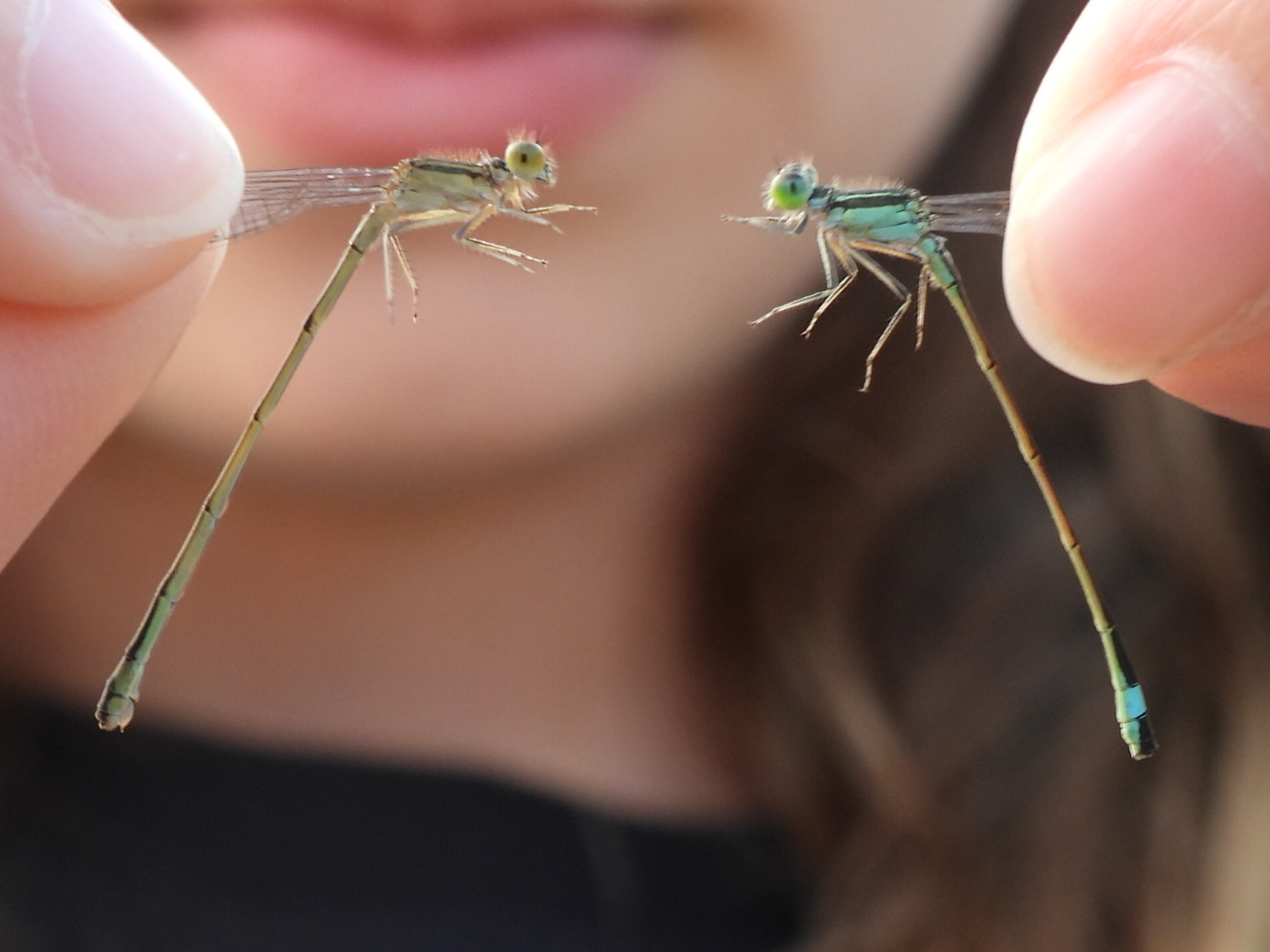
Male and female, Saudi Arabia

Blue male, United Arab Emirates
