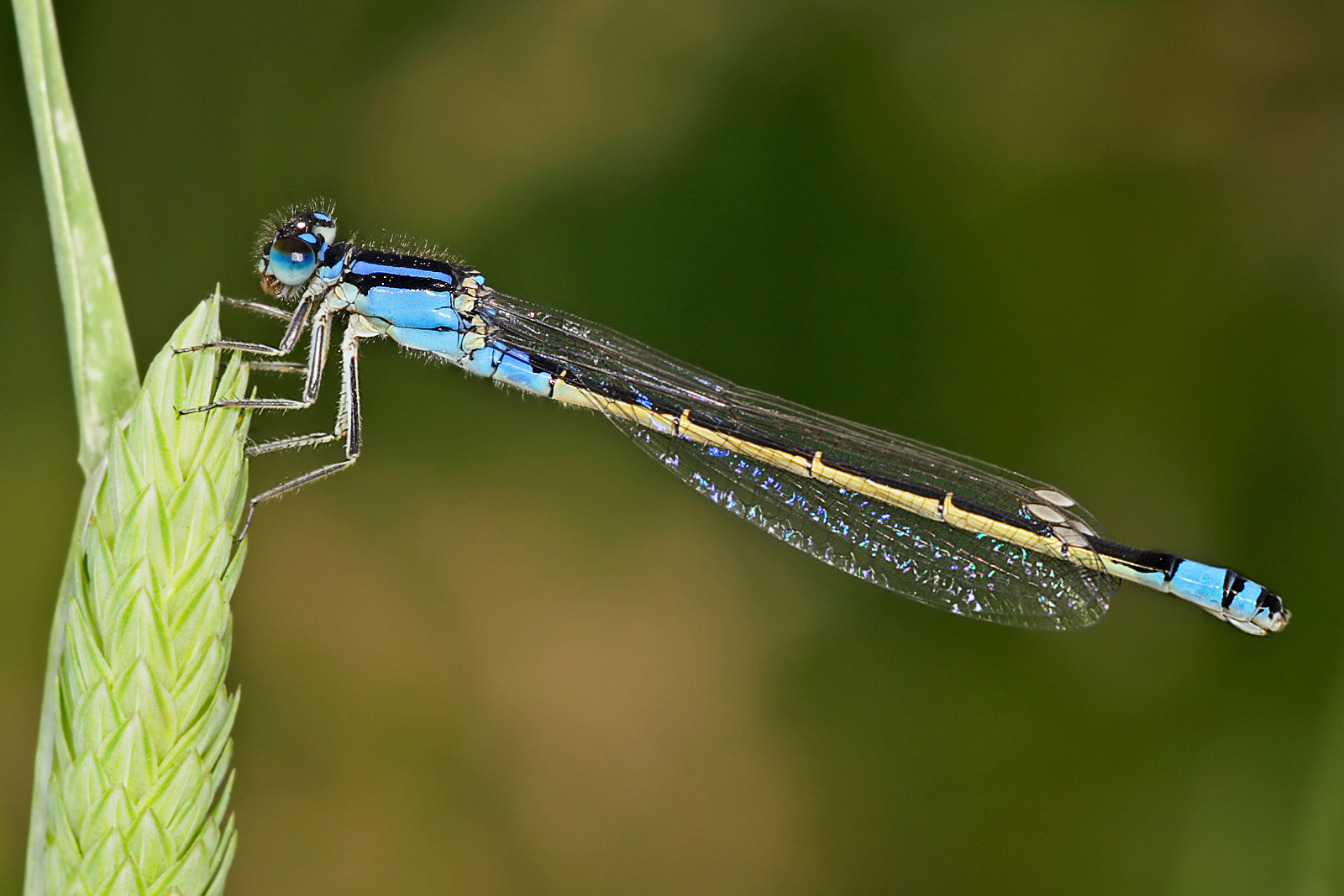
- Ischnura heterosticta

Scientific classification
- Kingdom: Animalia
- Phylum: Arthropoda
- Clade: Pancrustacea
- Class: Insecta
- Order: Odonata
- Suborder: Zygoptera
- Family: Coenagrionidae
- Genus: Ischnura; Charpentier, 1840

Synonyms
- Micronympha Kirby, 1890; Nanosura Kennedy, 1920

= Ischnura =

Genus of damselflies

Ischnura is a genus of damselflies known as forktails or bluetails in the family Coenagrionidae. The genus is distributed worldwide, including various oceanic islands. The males have a forked projection and blue segments at the tip of the abdomen which give the group their common names.

== Characteristics ==
Forktails are small or very small damselflies. The compound eyes of mature individuals have a dark upper region and contrasting lower part. The thorax is often green and may have lateral stripes and the abdomen in males is black with a blue tip. Females of some species are polymorphic, some being orangish and darkening with age, while others resemble the male.

== Etymology ==
The genus name Ischnura is derived from the Greek ἰσχνός (ischnos, "thin" or "slender") and οὐρά (oura, "tail"), referring to the slender abdomen of species in the genus.

== Species ==
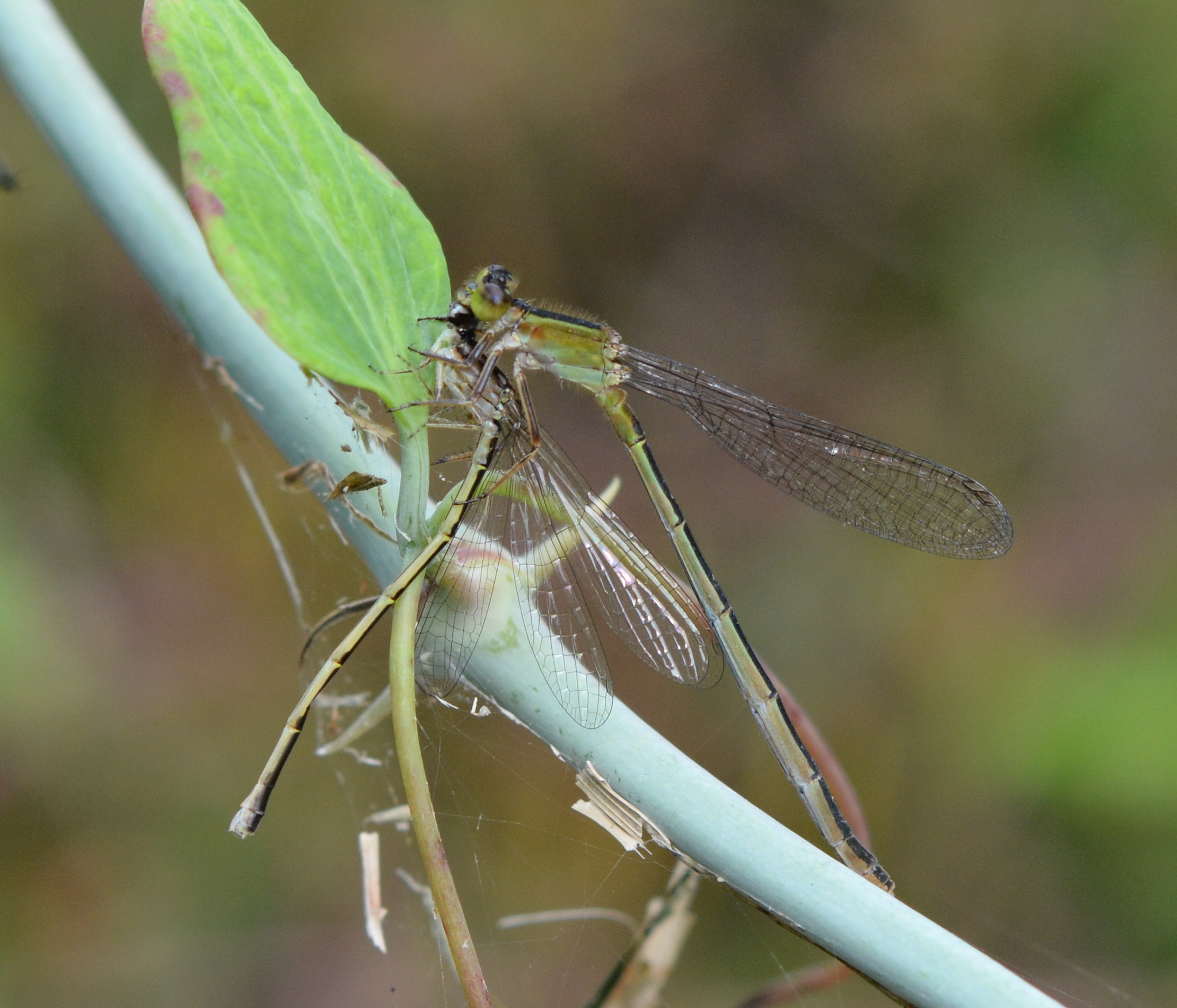
Ischnura ramburii feeding on Ischnura posita

The genus Ischnura includes the following species:

- Ischnura abyssinica Martin, 1908
- Ischnura acuticauda Lieftinck, 1959
- Ischnura albistigma Fraser, 1927
- Ischnura aralensis Haritonov, 1979
- Ischnura ariel Lieftinck, 1949
- Ischnura asiatica (Brauer, 1865) – Redtail
- Ischnura aurora Brauer, 1865 – Aurora bluetail
- Ischnura barberi Currie, 1903 – Desert forktail
- Ischnura buxtoni Fraser, 1927
- Ischnura capreolus (Hagen, 1861)
- Ischnura cardinalis Kimmins, 1929
- Ischnura cervula Selys, 1876 – Pacific forktail
- Ischnura chingaza Realpe, 2010
- Ischnura chromostigma Fraser, 1927
- Ischnura cruzi De Marmels, 1987
- Ischnura cyane Realpe, 2010
- Ischnura damula Calvert, 1902 – Plains forktail
- Ischnura demorsa (Hagen, 1861) – Mexican forktail
- Ischnura denticollis (Burmeister, 1839) – Black-fronted forktail
- Ischnura dorothea Fraser, 1924
- Ischnura elegans (Vander Linden, 1823) – Blue-tailed damselfly
- Ischnura erratica Calvert, 1895 – Swift forktail
- Ischnura evansi Morton, 1919 – Desert Bluetail
- Ischnura ezoin (Asahina, 1952)
- Ischnura filosa Schmidt, 1951
- Ischnura fluviatilis Selys, 1876
- Ischnura forcipata Morton, 1907
- Ischnura fountaineae Morton, 1905 – Oasis bluetail
- Ischnura gemina (Kennedy, 1917) – San Francisco forktail
- Ischnura genei (Rambur, 1842) – Island bluetail
- Ischnura graellsii (Rambur, 1842) – Iberian bluetail
- Ischnura haemastigma Fraser, 1927
- Ischnura hastata (Say, 1839) – Citrine forktail
- Ischnura heterosticta (Burmeister, 1839) – Common bluetail
- Ischnura inarmata Calvert, 1898
- Ischnura indivisa (Ris, 1918)
- Ischnura intermedia Dumont 1974
- Ischnura isoetes Lieftinck, 1949
- Ischnura karafutonis Matsumura, 1931
- Ischnura kellicotti Williamson, 1898 – Lilypad forktail
- Ischnura luta Polhemus, Asquith & Miller, 2000
- Ischnura ordosi Bartenev, 1912
- Ischnura pamelae Vick & Davies, 1988
- Ischnura perparva Selys, 1876 – Western forktail
- Ischnura posita (Hagen, 1861) – Fragile forktail
- Ischnura prognata (Hagen, 1861) – Furtive forktail
- Ischnura pruinescens (Tillyard, 1906) – Colourful bluetail
- Ischnura pumilio (Charpentier, 1825) – Small bluetail or scarce blue-tailed damselfly
- Ischnura ramburii (Selys, 1850) – Rambur's forktail
- Ischnura rhodosoma Lieftinck, 1959
- Ischnura rubella Navás, 1934
- Ischnura rubilio Selys, 1876
- Ischnura rufostigma Selys, 1876
- Ischnura rufovittata (Blanchard, 1843)
- Ischnura saharensis Aguesse, 1958 – Sahara bluetail
- Ischnura sanguinostigma Fraser, 1953
- Ischnura senegalensis (Rambur, 1842) – Marsh bluetail
- Ischnura spinicauda Brauer, 1865
- Ischnura stueberi Lieftinck, 1932
- Ischnura taitensis Selys, 1876
- Ischnura thelmae Lieftinck, 1966
- Ischnura ultima Ris, 1908
- †Ischnura velteni Bechly, 2000
- Ischnura verticalis (Say, 1839) – Eastern forktail
- Ischnura vinsoni Fraser, 1949
