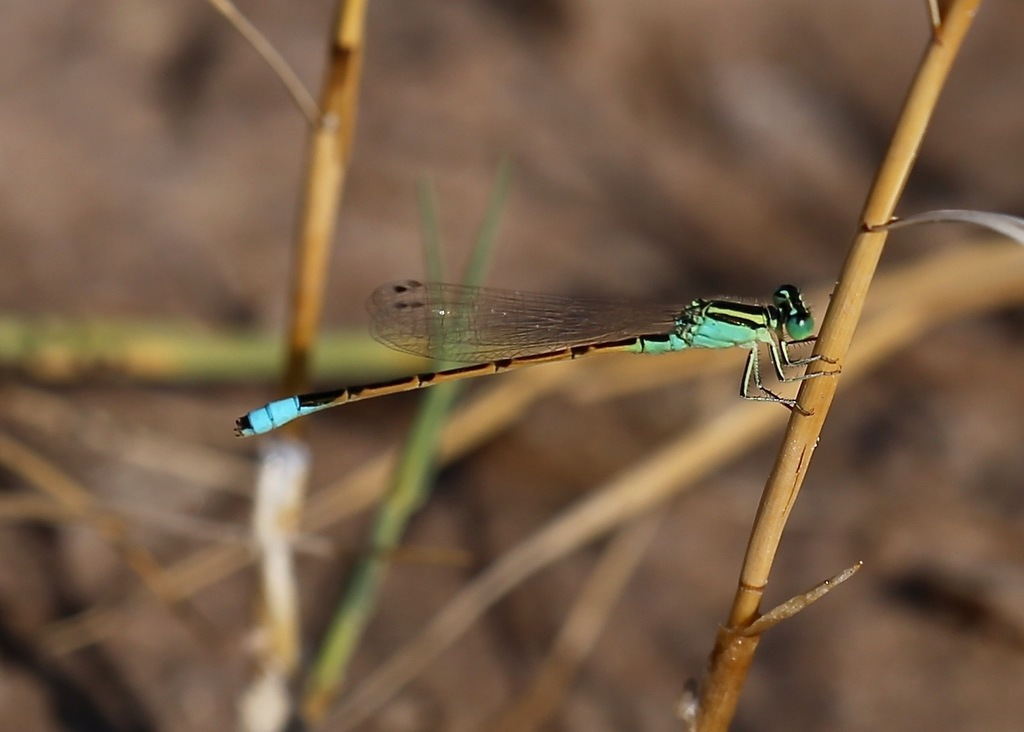

Conservation status
- Least Concern (IUCN 3.1)

Scientific classification
- Kingdom: Animalia
- Phylum: Arthropoda
- Clade: Pancrustacea
- Class: Insecta
- Order: Odonata
- Suborder: Zygoptera
- Family: Coenagrionidae
- Genus: Ischnura
- Species: I. barberi

Binomial name
- Ischnura barberi Currie, 1903

= Ischnura barberi =

Species of damselfly

Ischnura barberi, the desert forktail, is a species of narrow-winged damselfly in the family Coenagrionidae. It is found in North America.

The IUCN conservation status of Ischnura barberi is "LC", least concern, with no immediate threat to the species' survival. The population is stable.
