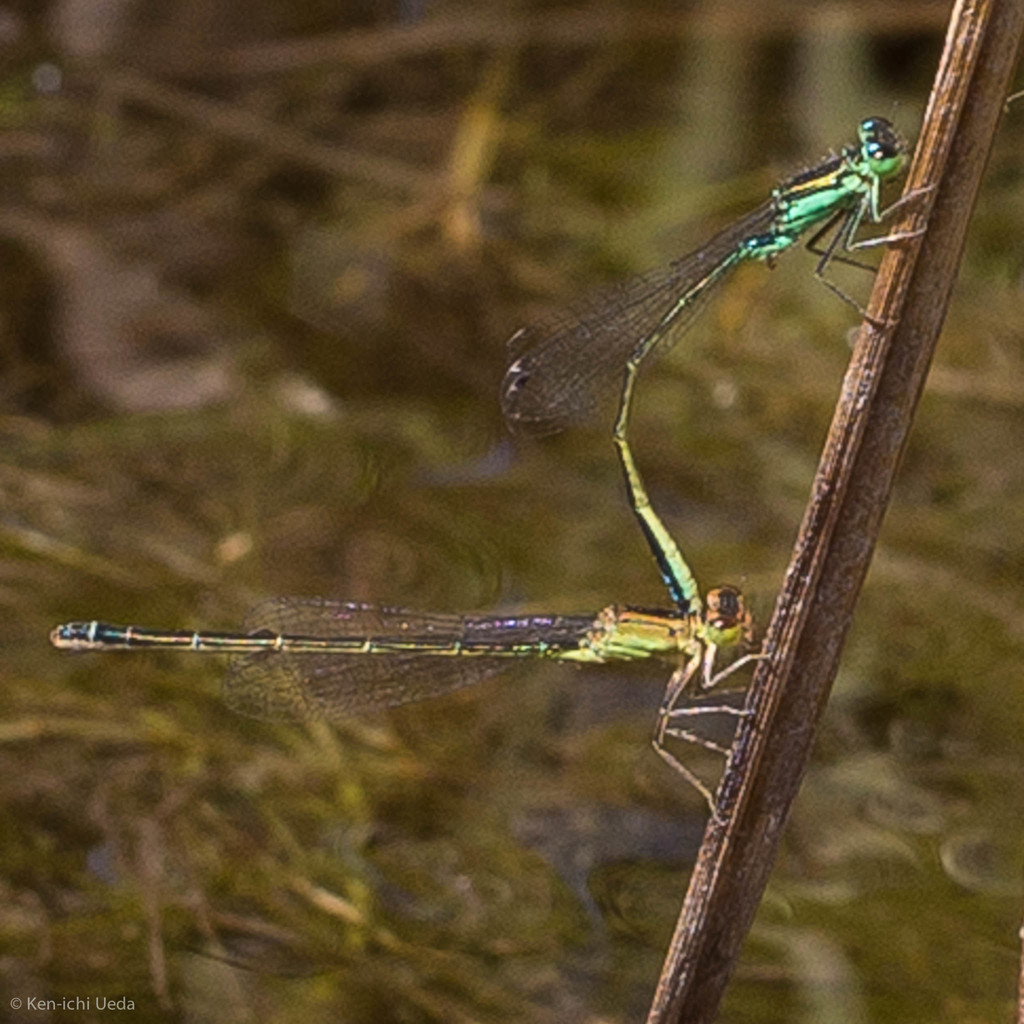

Conservation status
- Least Concern (IUCN 3.1)

Scientific classification
- Kingdom: Animalia
- Phylum: Arthropoda
- Clade: Pancrustacea
- Class: Insecta
- Order: Odonata
- Suborder: Zygoptera
- Family: Coenagrionidae
- Genus: Ischnura
- Species: I. denticollis

Binomial name
- Ischnura denticollis (Burmeister, 1839)

= Ischnura denticollis =

Species of damselfly

Ischnura denticollis, the black-fronted forktail, is a species of narrow-winged damselfly in the family Coenagrionidae. It is found in Central America and North America.

The IUCN conservation status of Ischnura denticollis is "LC", least concern, with no immediate threat to the species' survival. The population is stable.
