= Save the Children State of the World's Mothers report =

Annual report by Save the Children

The lifetime risk of maternal death from pregnancy-related causes from the SOWM2010 report. Each color represents a twofold difference — risk more than one in: 8 / 16 / 32; 64 / 128 / 250; 500 / 1000 / 2000; 4000 / 8000 / 16000; 32000 / 64000; Millennium Development Goal 5 represents a change of two colors (75% reduction) for each nation.

The Save the Children State of the World's Mothers report (SOWM report) is an annual report by the Save the Children USA, which compiles statistics on the health of mothers and children and uses them to produce rankings of more than 170 countries, showing where mothers fare best and where they face the greatest hardships. The rankings are presented in the Mothers' Index, which has been produced annually since the year 2000.

The 2014 report focuses on saving mothers and children in humanitarian crises. It finds that over half the 800 maternal and 18,000 child deaths every day take place in fragile settings which are at high risk of conflict and are particularly vulnerable to the effects of natural disasters.

The 2014 report ranks Finland the number one place to be a mother. Somalia in the Horn of Africa replaced Democratic Republic of the Congo (ranking 178th) as the worst place in the world to be a mother. The United States is down one spot from 2013, ranking 31st. Statistics show that 1 in 27 women from the bottom ranking countries will die from pregnancy-related causes. In addition, 1 in 7 children will die before their fifth birthday.

The 2015 report is the last edition of the report published on the Save the Children website.

== 2014 SOWM Report: Key Findings ==
- More than 60 million women and children are in need of humanitarian assistance this year.
- Violence and conflict have uprooted more families than at any time on record.
- Since the Mothers' Index was launched in 2000, the majority of the bottom 10 countries have been in the midst of, or emerging from, a recent humanitarian emergency.
- Civil war in the Democratic Republic of the Congo has led to horrific abuses against women and children, and claimed more than 5.4 million lives. But less than 10 percent of these deaths have occurred in combat. Most deaths have been due to preventable or treatable causes such as malaria, diarrhea, pneumonia, newborn causes and malnutrition.
- Syria's civil war has had a devastating impact on mothers and children. At least 1.3 million children and 650,000 women have fled the conflict and become refugees in neighboring countries, while over 9 million people inside Syria are in need of lifesaving humanitarian assistance.
- The Philippines' resiliency is being tested by more frequent and increasingly severe emergencies. Typhoon Haiyan on November 8, 2013 was one of the most destructive typhoons to ever hit land. It killed more than 6,000 people, devastated more than 2,000 hospitals and health clinics and destroyed countless health records and computer systems.
- In the United States, despite the lessons learned from Hurricane Katrina and other recent disasters, many gaps remain in emergency planning and preparedness. While the conditions facing mothers and children in the U.S. are very different from those in developing or middle-income countries, there are common challenges, including the resilience of health care and other essential services, and the extent to which humanitarian response reaches those mothers and children in greatest need.

== 2013 SOWM Report: Key Findings ==
An original analysis by Save the Children estimates that within the first month of life, more than 1 million babies could be saved each year with universal access to these products, which cost between 13 cents and $6 each and are ready for rapid scale-up now. The products are:

- steroid injections for women in preterm labor (to reduce deaths due to premature babies' breathing problems);
- resuscitation devices (to save babies who do not breathe at birth);
- chlorhexidine cord cleansing (to prevent umbilical cord infections); and
- injectable antibiotics (to treat newborn sepsis and pneumonia).

== 2012 SOWM Report: Key Findings ==
- Many children in many countries are not getting adequate nutrition during their first 1000 days of life.
- The malnutrition of children is widespread and limits the future success of both children and their countries.
- Malnutrition cannot be solved by economic growth alone.
- Health workers save millions of children.
- The United States has the least favorable environment for breastfeeding mothers (in the industrialized world).
- The top 10 countries in the 2012 SOWM Report are: Norway, Iceland, Sweden, New Zealand, Denmark, Finland, Australia, Belgium, Ireland, Netherlands and UK (tied).
- The bottom 10 countries (ranked 155-164) in the 2012 SOWM Report are: Democratic Republic of Congo, South Sudan, Sudan, Chad, Eritrea, Mali, Guinea-Bissau, Yemen, Afghanistan, and Niger.

=== Vital Statistics ===
- More than 2.6 million child deaths each year are caused by malnutrition.
- Stunted (bodies and minds have suffered permanent, irreversible damage from malnutrition) children make up approximately 27% of all children globally (or about 171 million).
- Breastfed children in developing countries are a minimum of 6 times more likely to survive in the early months of life than children who are not breastfed.
- Stunting rates at 12 months could be cut by around 20% if all children in the developing world were to receive adequate nutrition and feeding of solid foods with breastfeeding.
- If breastfeeding were practiced optimally, it could prevent approximately 1 million deaths each year. This is because breastfeeding is the single most effective nutrition intervention for saving lives.
- On average, adults who were malnourished as children can earn an estimated 20% less than those who were not malnourished as children.
- Due to the effects of malnutrition in developing countries, losses in GDP can add up to 2–3% annually.
- Malnutrition is estimated to cost $20–30 billion per year globally.
- Thirty counties have stunting rates of 40% or more.

==== Types of Malnutrition ====
Stunting – Stunting is when a child is too short for their age. It is caused by poor diet and frequent infections. Generally, stunting occurs before the age of 2, with largely irreversible effects. These effects include: delayed motor development, impaired cognitive function, and poor performance in school.

- 27% of all children globally are stunted.

Wasting – Wasting is when a child's weight is too low for their height. Wasting is caused by acute malnutrition. It is a strong predictor of mortality for children under 5 years old. Usually, it is caused by either food shortage or disease.

- 10% of all children globally are wasted.

Underweight – When a child is underweight, the child's weight is too low for their age. Being underweight can mean the child is stunted, wasted or both. Weight is an indicator of short-term undernutrition. A deficit in height (i.e. stunting) is difficult to correct but a deficit in weight (i.e. underweight) can be resolved if nutrition and health are improved later in childhood.

- More than 100 million children are underweight worldwide.
- 19% of child deaths are associated with being underweight.

Micronutrient deficiency – Micronutrient deficiency is when a child is lacking essential vitamins or minerals such as Vitamin A, iron, and zinc. These deficiencies are caused by a long-term lack of nutritious food or they can be caused by infections such as worms.

- 10% of all children's deaths are associated with micronutrient deficiencies.

==== Nutrition in the First 1000 Days ====
There are 171 million children (17%) globally who do not have the opportunity to reach their full potential. This is due to not only the physical, but the mental effects of poor nutrition in the earliest months of life.

- More than 2.6 million children and 100,000 mothers die every year as a result of under nutrition.
- Poor nutrition can weaken immune systems which can make both children and adults more likely to die of diarrhea or pneumonia. It can also impair the effectiveness of life saving medications.
- During the critical 1000-day window, good nutrition is crucial to develop a child's cognitive capacity and their physical growth.
- 1 in 4 of the world's children are chronically malnourished (stunted).

==== Children's Wellbeing of the Mother's Index ====
Out of 171 countries, Iceland is first and Somalia is last.

- Every child in Iceland enjoys both good education and good health.
- In Somalia, children face the highest risk of death in the world. On average, more than one in six children will die before the age of 5.
- Nearly 1/3 of Somali children are malnourished.
- 70% of children in Somalia lack access to safe water.
- Less than 1 in 3 Somali children are enrolled in school and boys outnumber girls almost 2 to 1.

==== "Lifesaving Six" ====
More than half of the world's children do not have access to the "Lifesaving Six": iron folate, breastfeeding, complementary feeding, vitamin A, zinc, and hygiene.

- Globally, more than 2 million children's lives could be saved each year if the "Lifesaving Six" could be implemented.
- Malnutrition rates usually peak during the time of complementary feeding.

Vitamin A

- Approximately 190 million preschool-age children don't get enough vitamin A.
- Approximately 19 million (15%) of pregnant women don't get enough vitamin A.
- Vitamin A deficiencies are a contributing factor each year in 1.3 million deaths due to diarrhea and almost 118,000 deaths from measles.
- Vitamin A deficiencies can lead to partial and total blindness.
- Vitamin A costs 2 cents a dose and could reduce about 2% of child deaths yearly if children were given two doses a year.

Zinc

- Zinc costs 2 cents a tablet and a full life-saving course of zinc treatment (for diarrhea) would cost less than 30 cents.
- It is estimated that 4% of child deaths could be prevented if diarrhea could be treated with zinc.

Hygiene

- Washing hands with soap could prevent diarrheal disease and pneumonia, which combined are responsible for 2.9 million child deaths every year.
- It is estimated that 3% of child deaths could be prevented if children had access to safe drinking water, improved sanitation facilities, and good hygiene (especially hand washing).

Breastfeeding

- Breastfeeding is the single most effective nutrition intervention for saving the lives of children. It could prevent close to 1 million deaths each year.
- In developing countries, children who are breastfed are at least six times more likely to survive the early months of life that children who are not breastfed.
- It is estimated that in the United States alone, low rates of breastfeeding add $13 billion to medical costs yearly.

== 2012 Mothers' Index ==
Norway

- In Norway, a skilled health professional is present at virtually every birth.
- Typically, a girl in Norway can expect to receive 18 years of formal education and live to be 83 years of age on average.
- 82% of Norwegian women use some method of birth control or other form of contraception.
- In Norway, only 1 in 175 families will lose a child before their fifth birthday.

Niger

- In Niger only a third of births are attended by some sort of health personnel.
- Typically, a girl in Niger can expect to receive only 4 years of education and live to be 56 years of age on average.
- Only 5% of women in Niger use some method of birth control or other form of contraception.
- In Niger, approximately 1 in 7 children die before their fifth birthday. According to these statistics, every mother is likely to lose a child.

== 2011 Mothers' Index ==
Norway

- In Norway, a skilled health professional is present at virtually every birth compared to Afghanistan where only 14% of births are attended.
- Typically, a girl in Norway can expect to receive 18 years of formal education and live to be 83 years of age on average.
- 82% of Norwegian women use some method of birth control or other form of contraception.
- In Norway, only 1 in 175 families will lose a child before their fifth birthday.

Afghanistan

- In Afghanistan, a woman generally has less than five years of education and will probably not live to be 45 years old.
- Less than 16% of Afghan women use some method of birth control or other form of contraception.
- In Afghanistan, approximately 1 in 5 children die before their fifth birthday. According to these statistics, every mother in Afghanistan is likely to lose a child.

== 2010 SOWM Report: Key Findings ==
- A large number of countries are not able to provide basic health care that could save mothers' and children's lives.
- Female health workers play a critical role in saving the lives of women, newborns, and young children.
- Small investments in female health workers can have a measurable impact on survival rates in more isolated rural communities.
- The most effective health care can begin at home.
- Countries with more front-line female health workers have seen considerable declines in maternal, newborn, and child mortality.

== 2010 Mothers' Index ==
Norway

- In Norway, a skilled health professional is present at virtually every birth compared to Afghanistan where only 14% of births are attended.
- Typically, a girl in Norway can expect to receive 18 years of formal education and live to be 83 years of age on average.
- 82% of Norwegian women use some method of birth control or other form of contraception.
- In Norway, only 1 in 132 families will lose a child before their fifth birthday.

Afghanistan

- In Afghanistan, a woman generally has a little more than four years of education and will probably live to be around 44 years old.
- Less than 16% of Afghan women use some method of birth control or other form of contraception.
- In Afghanistan, approximately 1 in 4 children die before their fifth birthday. According to these statistics, every mother in Afghanistan is likely to lose a child.

== Press coverage ==
The reports have been widely covered in the world press, with attention for local strengths and weaknesses. For example, in 2010 USA Today focused on the low ranking of the U.S. (28th place, below Estonia, Latvia, and Croatia) due to high rates of maternal and infant mortality, low preschool enrollment, and a particularly weak maternal leave benefit. It quoted the report:

A woman in the United States is more than five times as likely as a woman in Bosnia and Herzegovina, Greece or Italy to die from pregnancy-related causes in her lifetime and her risk of maternal death is nearly 10-fold that of a woman in Ireland.

ABC News interviewed physicians and nonprofit leaders who questioned whether global comparisons could be made reliably, due to possible differences in the definition of ectopic pregnancy, stillbirth, and abortion statistics. Relevant factors may include lack of health insurance, illegal immigration by women with poor prenatal care, and maternal obesity statistics. According to Michael Katz, a senior vice president at the March of Dimes Foundation, "The major question I would ask is, 'Why do African American populations have worse results than the white population?'"

Infant mortality rates before age 5. Map colors mark rates per 1000 of at least: 3 / 4 / 8 / 16; 32 / 64 / 128 / 257

Pravda.ru and Sify picked up an IANS/EFE report focusing on Cuba's rating as the best place to be a mother in the developing world. The Herald Sun boasted Australia's second-best placement for mothers, quoting a happy mother about hospital, maternal and child health support, and 12-month workplace maternal leave. However, the Adelaide Advertiser focused on Australia's lower [28th] ranking on the Children's Index, due in part to a child mortality rate three times higher for aboriginal infants. It quoted Save The Children's Annie Pettitt:

An important first step would be to tackle the shortfall of almost 2000 midwives in Australia, especially in remote and rural areas where we know the shortage is greatest.

An editorial in the Philippine Daily Inquirer discussed explanations for the Philippine's 48th-place ranking in the second tier. The column attributed much of the problem to a "brain drain", though it described as "much too high" the SOWM report's figure that 85% of Filipino nurses leave to pursue better pay and standards of living overseas. It questioned standards at "diploma mills" and called for incentives to bring health professionals into poor communities, while criticizing the chilling effects of a "raid on a training session of health-care workers" as subversives in Morong, Rizal. The Philippines local chapter of Save the Children produced a State of Filipino Mothers report in 2008 with rankings by province.

The Times of India lamented India's 73rd of 77th place in the second tier, describing a critical shortage of 74,000 accredited social health activists and 21,066 auxiliary nurse midwives below governmental norms and that thousands of women were dying because they could not access the most basic healthcare facilities or that, if they were available, they were low quality.

Though data for some countries are not known with much certainty, the SOWM 2010 report had many findings in common with a recent study published in The Lancet, which found that 23 of 181 countries are on track to achieve Millennium Development Goal 5 of a 75% reduction in maternal mortality rate between 1990 and 2015.

== Activism ==
The 2010 report was released by Save the Children in Canada on May 4, 10:00 a.m., as a part of an action directed toward members of Parliament in support of an announcement by Prime Minister Stephen Harper that child and maternal health would be the top priority at the 36th G8 summit in Huntsville, Ontario in June. As described in the press release:

In the week leading up to Mother's Day, 5,700 mothers around the world will die. During this Mother's Day week, CARE, the Canadian Association of Midwives, Plan Canada, Results, Save the Children Canada, the Society of Obstetricians and Gynaecologists of Canada, UNICEF and World Vision have joined forces in Ottawa to get the attention of the government and public, to have Canada put its leadership at the upcoming G8 into action and stop preventable child and maternal deaths

== 2014 rankings ==
The list is incomplete and only includes the top 35 countries.

Rank	Country	Lifetime risk of maternal death	Expected # of years of formal schooling
1	Finland	12,200	17.0
2	Norway	7,900	17.6
3	Sweden	14,100	15.8
4	Iceland	8,900	18.7
5	Netherlands	10,500	17.9
6	Denmark	4,500	16.9
7	Spain	12,000	17.1
8	Germany	10,600	16.3
9	Australia	8,100	19.9 (Note: Discounted to 18 years prior to calculating the index rank)
9	Belgium	7,500	16.2
11	Italy	20,300	16.3
12	Austria	8,100	15.6
13	Switzerland	9,500	15.7
14	Portugal	9,200	16.3
15	Singapore	25,300	14.4
16	New Zealand	3,300	19.4
17	Slovenia	5,900	16.8
18	Canada	5,200	15.8
19	Ireland	8,100	18.6
20	France	6,200	16.0
20	Greece	25,500	16.5
22	Luxembourg	3,200	13.9
23	Israel	25,100	16.5
24	Czech Republic	12,100	16.4
24	Lithuania	9,400	16.7
26	Belarus	16,300	15.7
26	United Kingdom	4,600	16.2
28	Estonia	5,100	15.7
29	Poland	14,400	15.5
30	South Korea	4,800	17.0
31	United States	2,400	16.5
32	Japan	13,100	15.3
33	Croatia	4,100	14.5
34	Latvia	2,000	15.5
35	Cuba	1,000	14.5

=== Additional maps (statistics pertaining to females) ===
Years formal schooling

National government seats

Modern contraception usage

Earned income relative to males

Lifespan

Gross preprimary enrollment ratio

== See also ==
- World Health Report
- Maternal health
