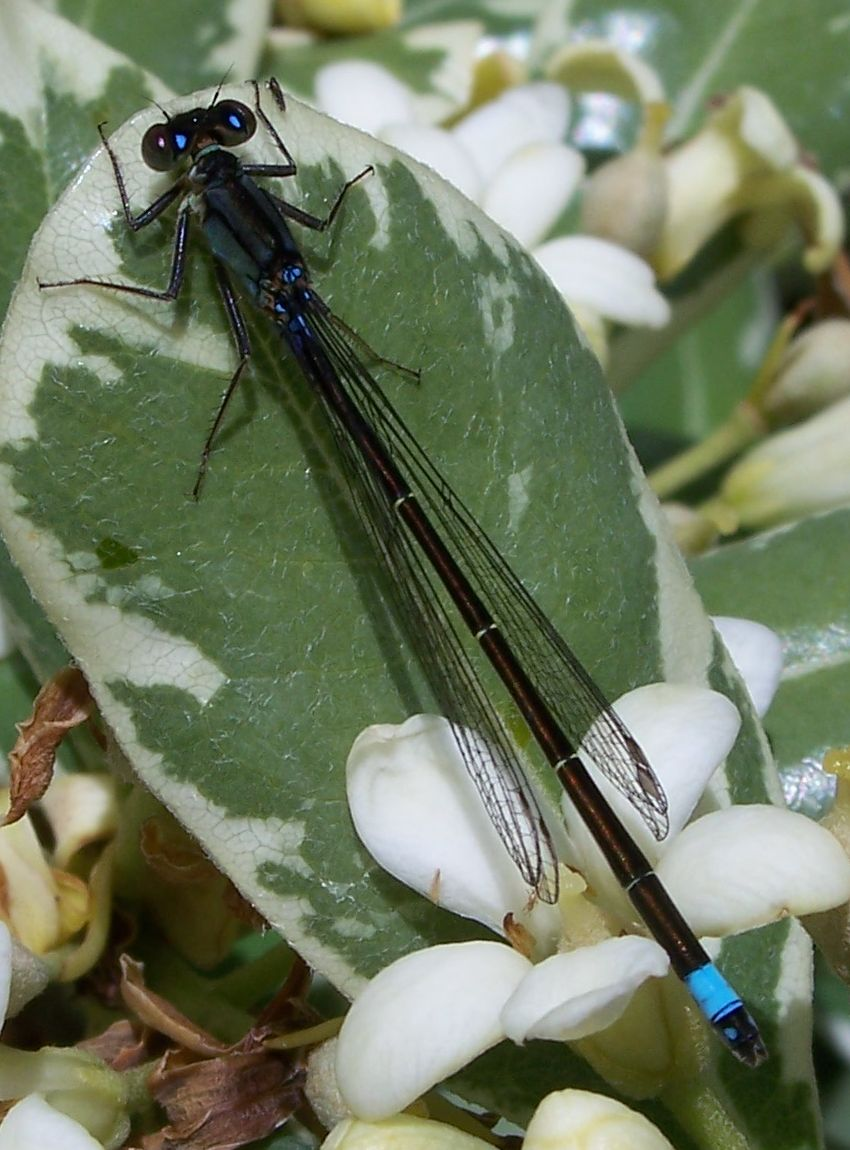

Conservation status
- Least Concern (IUCN 3.1)

Scientific classification
- Kingdom: Animalia
- Phylum: Arthropoda
- Clade: Pancrustacea
- Class: Insecta
- Order: Odonata
- Suborder: Zygoptera
- Family: Coenagrionidae
- Genus: Ischnura
- Species: I. cervula

Binomial name
- Ischnura cervula Selys, 1876

= Ischnura cervula =

Species of damselfly

Ischnura cervula, the Pacific forktail, is a species of narrow-winged damselfly in the family Coenagrionidae. It is found in western North America.

The species is notable for its female color polymorphism, occurring in an andromorphic or heteromorph form. Ischnura cervula occupy freshwater habitats, including springs, wetlands, and slow-moving waters with surrounding vegetation. The species also acts as an intermediate host for the lung fluke Haematoloechus longiplexus, introduced via American bullfrogs. Although listed as Least Concern by the IUCN, habitat loss, poor water quality, and climate change can negatively impact Ischnura cervula populations.

== Distribution and habitat ==
The Pacific Forktail is a western North American species that is present from southern British Columbia to Arizona and as far east as Alberta. Ischnura cervula populations have been observed at spring habitats in Banff National Park, Canada, which has many wetlands, slow-moving streams with surrounding vegetation. A comprehensive California Odonata database also records the species' presence over a century of records, highlighting how the distribution has changed over time and recognizes any emergent patterns of freshwater biodiversity changes.

== Behavior ==
Male mating harassment causes changes to female morph behavior, reducing foraging time and increasing the risk of injuries and predation. The andromorphic, male-mimicking form likely evolved as an adaptation to this harassment, as andromorphic females are less recognizable as potential mates to males and therefore avoid harassment.

Closely-related Ischnura damselfly species (I. gemina) in California have non-territorial males that engage in contact guarding of females during mating, with mating dynamics greatly influenced by the surrounding habitat structure.

== Evolution ==
Ischnura cervula is notable for its female color polymorphism (biology). Females can occur in a male-resembling andromorphic form, in which females mimic males in coloration, or a heteromorph form, where females look distinctly different from males. Furthermore, the species is placed within a North American clade of Ischnura damselflies that diversified during the Pleistocene ice age period likely due to habitat and climate changes over time. Damselfly species that are most closely-related to I. cervula include I. perparva, I. verticalis, I. posita, I. demorsa, and I. damula.

== Ecology ==
Ischnura cervula is often an intermediate host of the native damselfly species commonly infected by the parasite Haematoloechus longiplexus, which was introduced by the American bullfrog. Studies in Banff National Park have detailed the breeding and population dynamics of the species in freshwater ecosystems.

== Conservation ==
The IUCN conservation status of Ischnura cervula is "LC", least concern, with no immediate threat to the species' survival. The population is stable. The IUCN status was reviewed in 2018.

However, threats such as habitat loss, poor water quality, and climate change can greatly impact Ischnura cervula freshwater damselfly species. Previous studies on freshwater damselfly species have highlighted how drought conditions, water depth fluctuations, and water chemistry changes from climate change can impact damselfly populations and the species' survival.

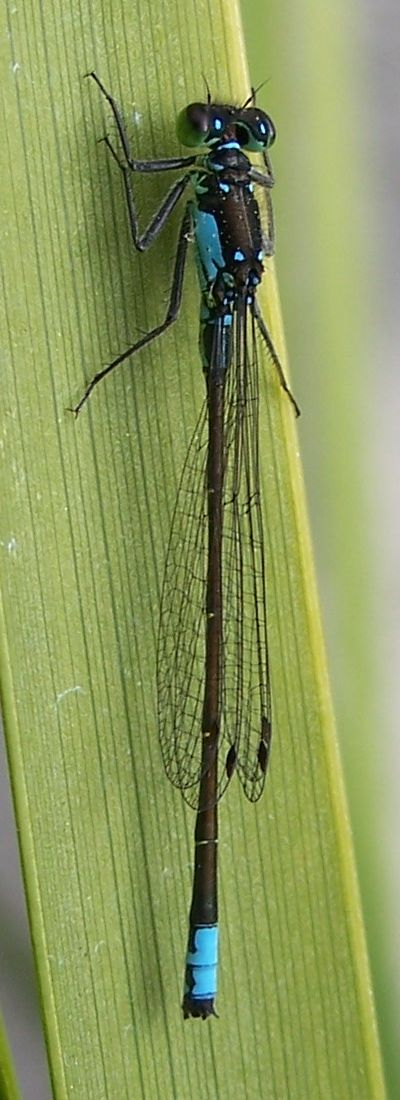
Pacific forktail, Ischnura cervula

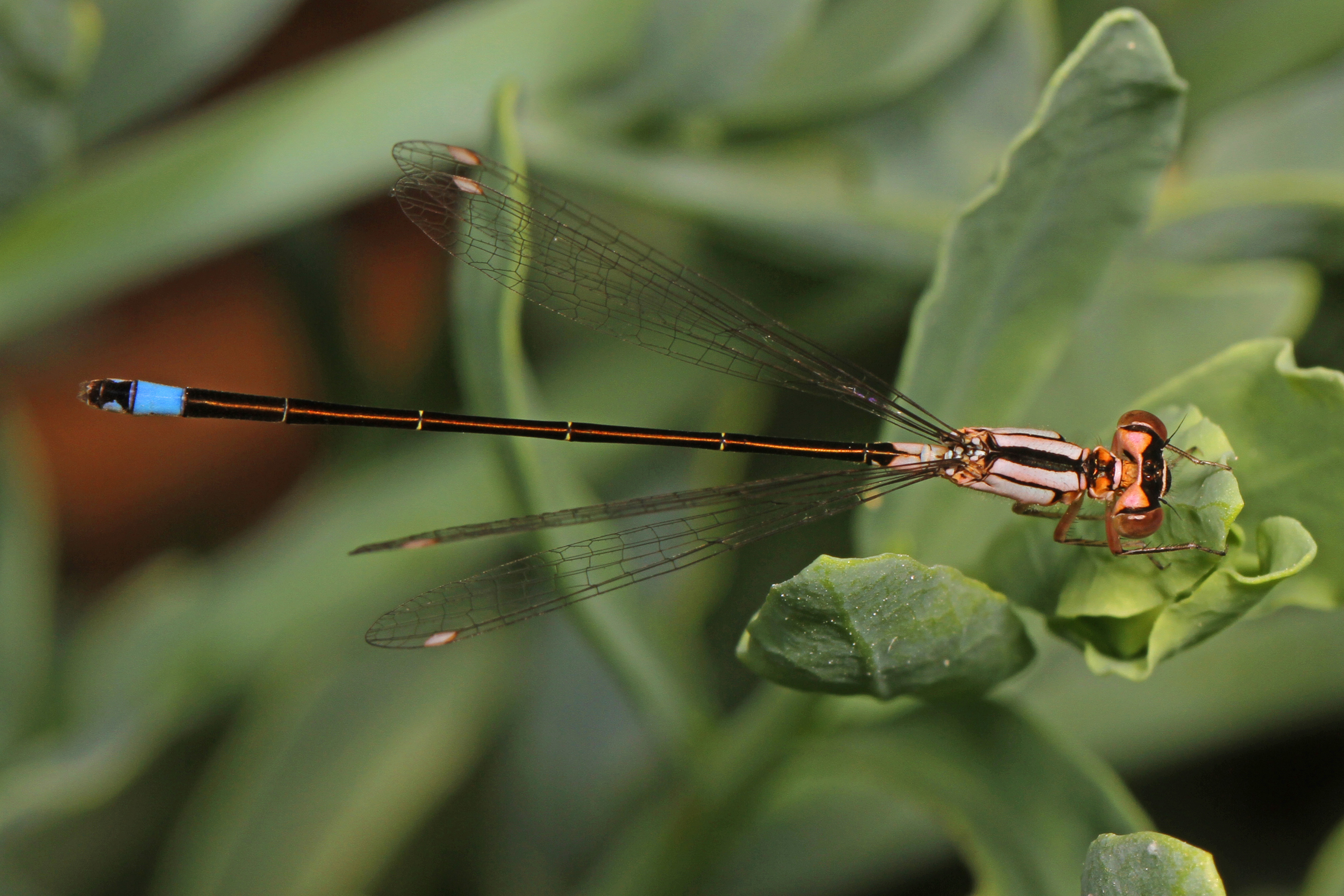
Pacific forktail, Ischnura cervula
