= Olive Masanza =

Malawian politician and author

- Born: 1951| April; Malawi
- Citizenship: Malawi
- Occupations: Politician, author
- Years active: 1990s–present
- Organization: Save the Children Fund (Malawi)
- Known for: Deputy Minister of Education; authorship
- Notable work: The Origins of Mang'anja People; Princes of Fate
- Office: Deputy Minister of Education (Primary and Secondary Education)

Olive Masanza (born April, 1951) is a Malawian politician and author who was the deputy minister for education responsible for primary and secondary education.

== Career ==
Masanza was part of the Save the Children Fund for Malawi where she cared for 3000 orphans in her area since 1997. She did this right after her retirement from civil service.

She was the Deputy Minister of Education and a member of parliament representing Mulanje Limbuli. In April 2025, she launched her two books titled "The Origins of Mang'anja People" and "Princes of Fate", a function held at Golden Peacock Hotel in Blantyre.

== Personal life ==
Masanza has a passion for storytelling and craft.

== See also ==
- Malawi
- Save the Children
- African literature
- Parliament of Malawi
