= Compensatory growth (organism) =

Accelerated growth of an organism following a period of slowed development

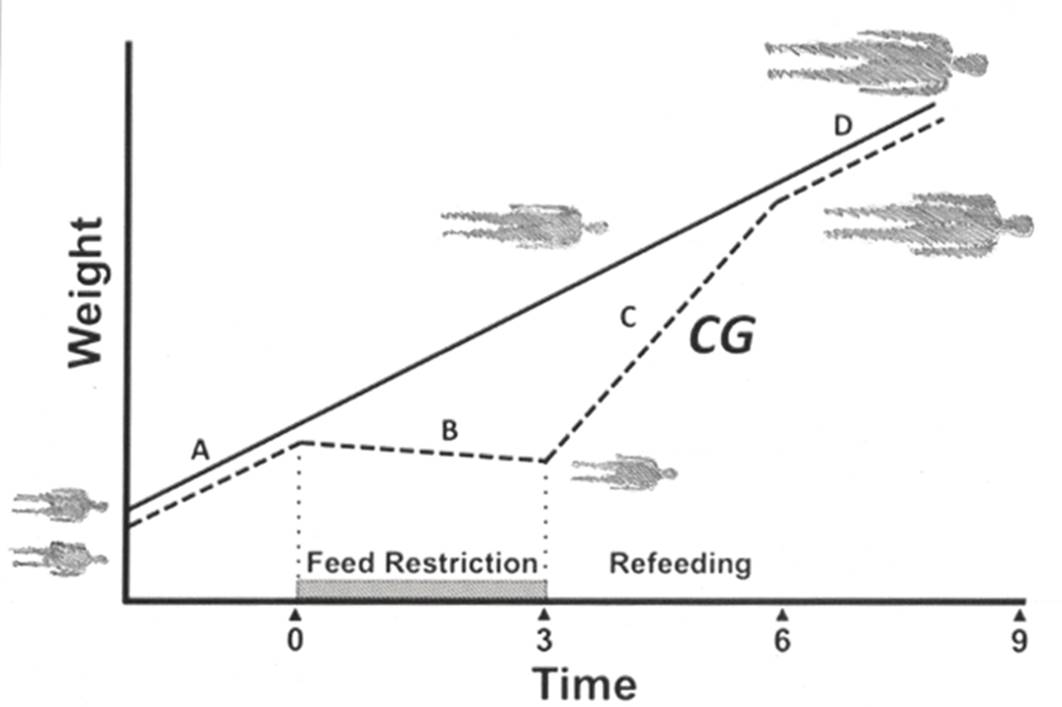
Representation of compensatory growth, although the compensating organism may often outgrow the normal organism.

Compensatory growth, known as catch-up growth and compensatory gain, is an accelerated growth of an organism following a period of slowed development, particularly as a result of nutrient deprivation. The growth may be with respect to weight or length (or height in humans). For example, the body weights of animals who experience nutritional restriction will often over time become similar to those of animals who did not experience such stress. It is possible for high compensatory growth rates to result in overcompensation, where the organism exceeds normal weight and often has excessive fat deposition.

An organism can recover to normal weight without additional time. Sometimes when the nutrient restriction is severe, the growth period is extended to reach the normal weight. If the nutrient restriction is severe enough, the organism may have permanent stunted growth where it does not ever reach normal weight. Usually in animals, complete recovery from carbohydrate and protein restriction occurs.

Compensatory growth has been observed in a number of organisms including humans, other species of mammals, birds, reptiles, fish, plants (especially grasses and young tree seedlings and saplings), fungi, microbes, pigs, and damselflies.

== History ==
In 1911, Hans Aron performed the earliest study of growth after periods of undernourishment. He underfed a dog and found that it still had the capacity to rapidly gain weight, though it did not reach the final weight of a dog that was fed normally. In 1915, Osborne and Mendel were the first to demonstrate that rats fed after growth restriction had an accelerated growth rate. In 1945, Brody developed the idea of "homoestasis of growth" in the book Bioenergetics and Growth. In 1955, Verle Bohman was the first to use the term "compensatory growth" in an article pertaining to beef cattle.

== Mechanism ==
In animals, homeostatic and homeorhetic processes are involved in the abnormally high growth rates. Homeostatic processes usually affect compensatory growth in the short term, whereas homeorhetic processes usually have a long-term effect.

First, during nutrient starvation, a reduction of basal metabolism takes place. The gut tissues are the first tissues to be reduced in weight and activity. Then, during the realimentation (re-feeding) phase, an increase in feeding enables more dietary protein and energy to be contributed for tissue growth instead of basal metabolism. The gut tissues are the first to increase in weight, followed by muscle tissue and finally adipose tissue.

The exact biological mechanisms for compensatory growth remain poorly understood. However, it is known that during the restriction period, levels of growth hormone (GH) are increased by the pituitary gland, while the number of GH receptors decrease. There is a decrease in insulin-like growth factor (IGF-1) as well. When this restriction is severe, amino acids are released from muscle cells and catabolic hormones circulate to initiate gluconeogenesis processes. Then, when compensation begins, the GH levels continue to remain high while insulin levels spike, allowing the GH to be used for growth processes. At first, lean muscle is built, but after a few weeks of refeeding, fat begins to accumulate on the organism. IGF-1 and thyroid hormones, on the other hand, approach normal levels much sooner. This may be why animals often have increased fat deposition after a period of refeeding.

== Effects of compensatory growth ==
Compensatory growth in an organism can have impacts on the organism's behavior and muscle development. These changes can occur during or after the period of compensation, and can lead to changes in behavior, movement, and body composition. During compensation, animals may experience changes in food intake, body composition (increased fat and lessened muscle), metabolism, and the endocrine system. Animals undergoing compensatory growth have been seen to have impaired muscle development after regrowth, which leads to impairments in locomotion and escape movements. Behavioral impacts such as increased risk-taking and aggression have also been seen, both during and after regrowth. Animals often have impaired movement due to lessened muscle development, yet they have been observed taking time during feeding, despite the risks of extended time spent eating. Brown trout (Salmon trutta) who have been treated with growth hormone after a period of deprivation have been observed to increase their growth rate but decrease their anti-predator responses, such as swimming in waters more accessible by predators. Increased aggression and decreased sexual displays have also been seen in animals undergoing compensatory growth.

== Studies of growth in anorexic human patients ==
Anorexia nervosa can have serious implications if its duration and severity are significant and if onset occurs before the completion of growth, pubertal maturation or prior to attaining peak bone mass. Both height gain and pubertal development are dependent on the release of growth hormone and gonadotrophins (LH and FSH) from the pituitary gland. Suppression of gonadotropins in patients with anorexia nervosa has been frequently documented. In some cases, especially where onset is pre-pubertal, physical consequences such as stunted growth and pubertal delay are usually fully reversible. Height potential is normally preserved if the duration and severity of anorexia nervosa are not significant and/or if the illness is accompanied with delayed bone age (especially prior to a bone age of approximately 15 years), as hypogonadism may negate the deleterious effects of undernutrition on stature by allowing for a longer duration of growth compared to controls. In such cases, appropriate early treatment can preserve height potential and may even help to increase it in some post-anorexic subjects due to the aforementioned reasons in addition to factors such as long-term reduced estrogen-producing adipose tissue levels compared to premorbid levels.

== Factors affecting compensatory growth ==
In 1960, Wilson and Osborne outlined six factors that could affect compensatory growth in a review article. The importance of each, some, or all of these factors is not well understood. These factors are as follows:

- The nature of the restricted diet
- The degree of severity of undernutrition
- The duration of the period of undernutrition
- The stage of development at the commencement of undernutrition
- The relative rate of maturity of the species
- The pattern of re-alimenation

Animal factors that can affect compensatory growth may include the maturity level and fat proportion of the animal at the time of nutrient deprivation, the genotype, the gender, and the metabolic changes. The stage of development of the animal when the nutrient restriction occurs greatly affects its body composition.

== See also ==
- Starvation
- Compensatory growth (organ)
- Stunted growth
- Malnutrition
