= First 1,000 days =

Childcare concept

The first 1,000 days describes the period from conception to 24 months of age in child development. This is considered a "critical period" in which sufficient nutrition and environmental factors have life-long effects on a child's overall health. While adequate nutrition can be exceptionally beneficial during this critical period, inadequate nutrition may also be detrimental to the child. This is because children establish many of their lifetime epigenetic characteristics in their first 1,000 days. Medical and public health interventions early on in child development during the first 1,000 days may have higher rates of success compared to those achieved outside of this period.

Adequate nutrition during the first 1,000 days can have a direct and indirect influence on both short and long term health outcomes. There are various risk factors in the first 1,000 days which, if present, are predictors of later obesity. Stunted growth may be remedied (catch-up growth) by attainment of proper nutritional status. This is especially important in adolescent girls, where it may break a cycle of inter-generational underdevelopment.

As a period of rapid growth and development, the first 1,000 days of life are foundational to child development and vulnerabilities to future non-communicable diseases such as cardiovascular or metabolic diseases.

== Microbiota ==
The first 1,000 days of the human microbiome starting from time of conception until 2 years old is a critical time period for growth and development, including nutrients and microbiota. Proper nutrition is an essential to support healthy life; lack of nutrition may have a lifelong negative impact to the child's development. During this time frame of early childhood growth, there are many immune and developmental pathways that are dependent on environmental factors such as nutrients; malnutrition can disrupt growth and development leading to obesity or malnutrition.

During pregnancy, the key microbiota are maternal microbiota and fetal microbiota. Microbiota from the mother is essential for the child's growth even before birth. Pre-birth microbial exposure, either excessive or lack of, can impact growth and development negatively and have long-term effect. For this reason, the mother's nutritional intake becomes important for the child both before birth and after birth.

The first 6 months after birth is characterized mainly by external exposure to microbiota. For instance, different feeding practices leads to different outcomes; breastfeeding and commercial milk will have different essential nutrients and microbiota. Antibiotics may have an effect on the gut microbiota; antibiotic exposure before birth may disrupt the gut microbiota permanently and disrupt the gut functions.

Transitioning into childhood, food intake after 6 months will be changed from milk to complementary foods; this is a critical period for children to get adequate nutrition necessary for growth. From this period, environmental factors start to impact the children more. In underserved communities where families may face food insecurities or poor living conditions, the risk of undernutrition and negative affect to microbial pathway may increase. Cases of undernutrition may be treated by gut microbiota targeted interventions in combination with nutrition; this will restore the lack/loss of microbiota the child has faced during their childhood and promote healthy growth.

Breastfeeding and vaginal birth forms the infant's microbiota which can protect against allergies from developing. However, not everyone can safely give vaginal birth or provide breastmilk due to different circumstances; for infants in these situations, it may be important to look out for specific ingredients such as probiotics in certain infant formulas to makeup for those microbiota.

== Epigenetics ==
=== Nutrition ===
Both maternal and early-childhood nutrition influence epigenetic changes, which then inform immunologic and metabolic outcomes throughout development and into later life. Present in human milk are HMOs, bioactive components which aid in immune function and regulation, and miRNA-containing exosomes. HMOs can be fermented into short-chain fatty acids, which play important roles in modulating the microbiome and in T cell differentiation, and may positively correlate with methylation levels. miRNA found in milk-derived exosomes may increase immune tolerance.

Metabolic disease, and particularly type 2 diabetes mellitus and insulin resistance, is strongly associated with malnutrition. Both parental undernutrition and overnutrition predispose a child to developing these conditions. Under these circumstances, differential methylation of adipose tissue genes and miRNA upregulation in adipose tissue and the pancreas may occur.

=== Stress exposure ===
Exposure to emotional, physical, and environmental stressors significantly affect the developing brain, which may later manifest in negative mental- and health-related outcomes through the HPA axis' role in stress regulation.

Maternal depression, anxiety, and stress may be associated with increased rates of mental disorders, including schizophrenia, depression, anxiety, ADHD, and autism in the child. Smoking in pregnancy is associated with differential methylation of genes implicated in brain development, central nervous system disorders, asthma, and various cancers. Stress management and smoking cessation in the birthing parent provide avenues for reducing this risk.

Babies born prematurely are often separated from the birthing parent and sequestered in neonatal intensive care units, where they may require additional care and procedures. Stress caused to the infant during this process is associated with epigenetic modifications relating to behavioral issues and stress regulation, notably hypermethylation of the SLC6A4 gene.

Other forms of childhood adversity, which include abuse or neglect, similarly impact a child's development through differential epigenetic programming and stress response dysregulation. In addition to adverse effects on mental health, children who experience these events often exhibit dampened immune responses.

== Nutrition and development ==
Sufficient overall nutrition within the first 1,000 days is vital to healthy neurological and physical growth. This includes, but is not limited to adequate amounts of macronutrients, micronutrients, as well as essential vitamins. The concept of adequate nutrition applies to both the carrying mother as well as the child. Carrying mothers have an increased physiological demand due to their unique circumstance of pregnancy. Their bodies immediately undergo huge changes which require additional nutritional needs. It is also important that mothers sustain adequate nutrition post delivery. This is not just for their own health but the health of their child as breastfeeding is a way that newborns obtain vital macronutrients, micronutrients, and vitamins. There are some macronutrients, micronutrients, and vitamins that may be better obtained and retained if acquired through breastfeeding which is why it is crucial that mothers maintain adequate nutrition post delivery. Key macronutrients include proteins and long-chain polyunsaturated fatty acids (LC-PUFA), while some key micronutrients include choline, iron, zinc, iodine, calcium, and magnesium. Essential vitamins are also vital for growth and development. This includes: Vitamin A, which is key for fetal development, organogenesis, limb formation, immune functions, mucosal integrity and body symmetry. A lack of vitamin A can lead to xerophthalmia, night blindness, and anemia. Vitamin D: which is essential for bone development while a deficiency in Vitamin D can lead to the development of rickets disease. Folate/folic acid: which prevents neural tube defects (NTDs). Children who do not receive adequate nutrition in the first 1,000 days can suffer short and long term health consequences. Some of these consequences can be mitigated if identified and addressed early, however they may become harder to rectify as more time passes. For the most part macronutrients, micronutrients, and essential vitamins can and should be obtained through a healthy and well balanced diet. However sometimes this may not be feasible for either the carrying mother or child. In these cases supplementation may be recommended or required. Overall, adequate nutrition within the first 1,000 days is a responsibility shared by caregivers (e.g. parents), as well as providers (e.g. pediatricians, social workers, dieticians).

=== Childhood obesity ===
Since the first 1,000 days of life span both intra- and extrauterine development, dietary requirements can be separated into three distinct phases of dietary development: prenatal, breast or formula feeding, and complementary diet.

==== Prenatal ====
Maternal factors such as Type I diabetes, pre-pregnancy weight, gestational diabetes, and gestational weight gain are all risk factors for childhood obesity. While this relationship between maternal factors and development of childhood obesity is not completely understood, it is theorized that altered intrauterine conditions due to elevated nutrient exposure affect fetal development such that the child is programmed to be at higher risk. Interventions to manage maternal pre-existing conditions, as well as gestational complications, such as maintaining healthy blood sugar levels and blood pressure may help to reduce this risk.

==== Breast/Formula feeding ====
Population studies have shown that breast feeding has a long-term benefit of preventing obesity in the future. Formula-fed children tend to follow an "accelerated growth curve" compared to breast-fed children who develop along a slower growth curve because they tend to have higher levels of Insulin-like Growth Factor (IGF)-1. This difference in levels of IGF-1 may be due to differences in nutrient compositions of breast milk and formula milk. This phase of dietary development is also highly dependent on the dietary behaviors of the mother.

==== Complementary diet ====
The final stage of dietary development is the longest of the three stages, spanning from months 6-24 and presents the most potential for developing risks for obesity. This is partially due to the fact that the complementary diet comprises the largest fraction of dietary development, but particularly because transitioning from liquid to solid foods presents a challenge of its own. More recent research has been expanding on the role of epigenetics and microbiota during the first 1,000 days in the development of childhood obesity.
