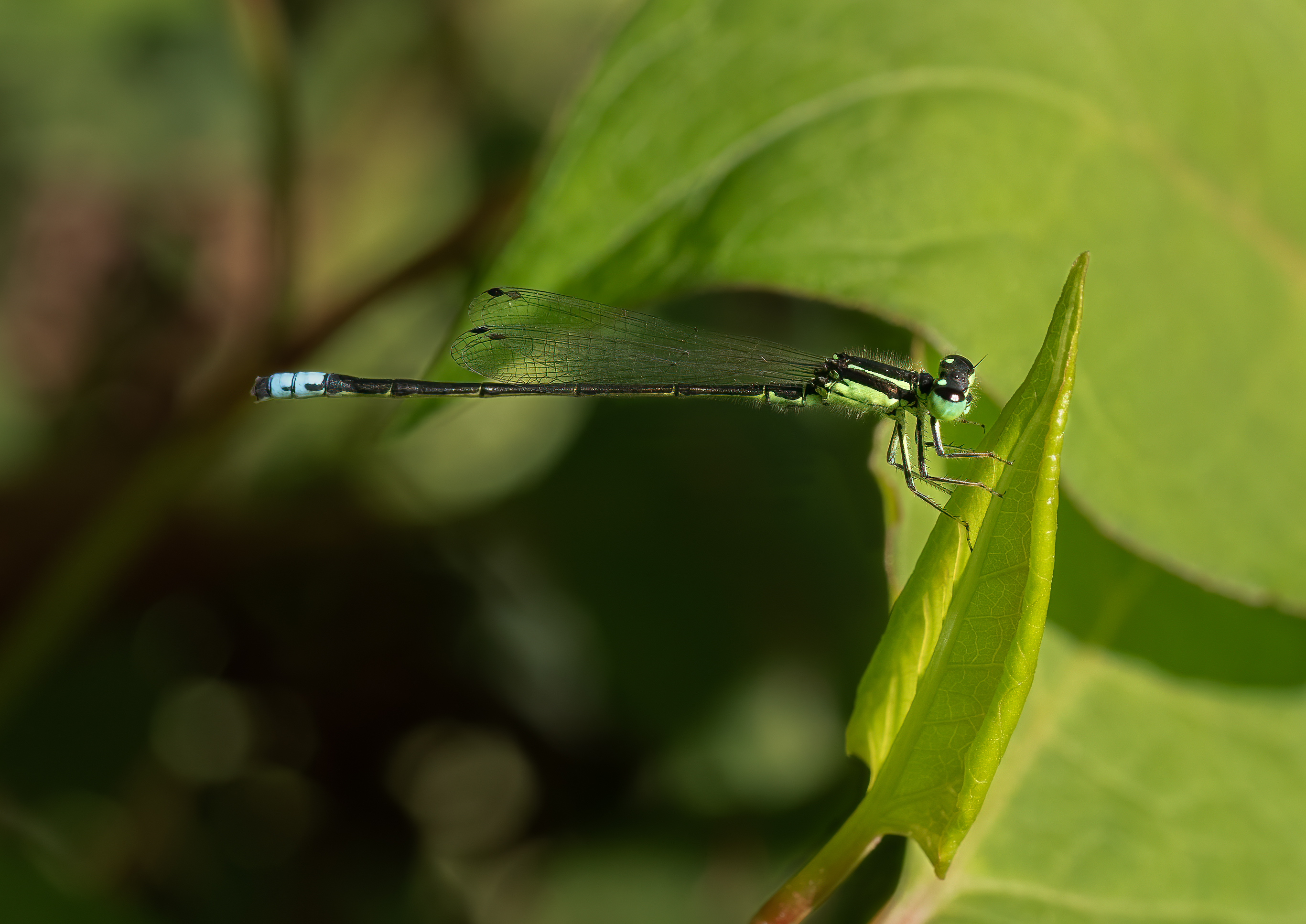
- Adult male
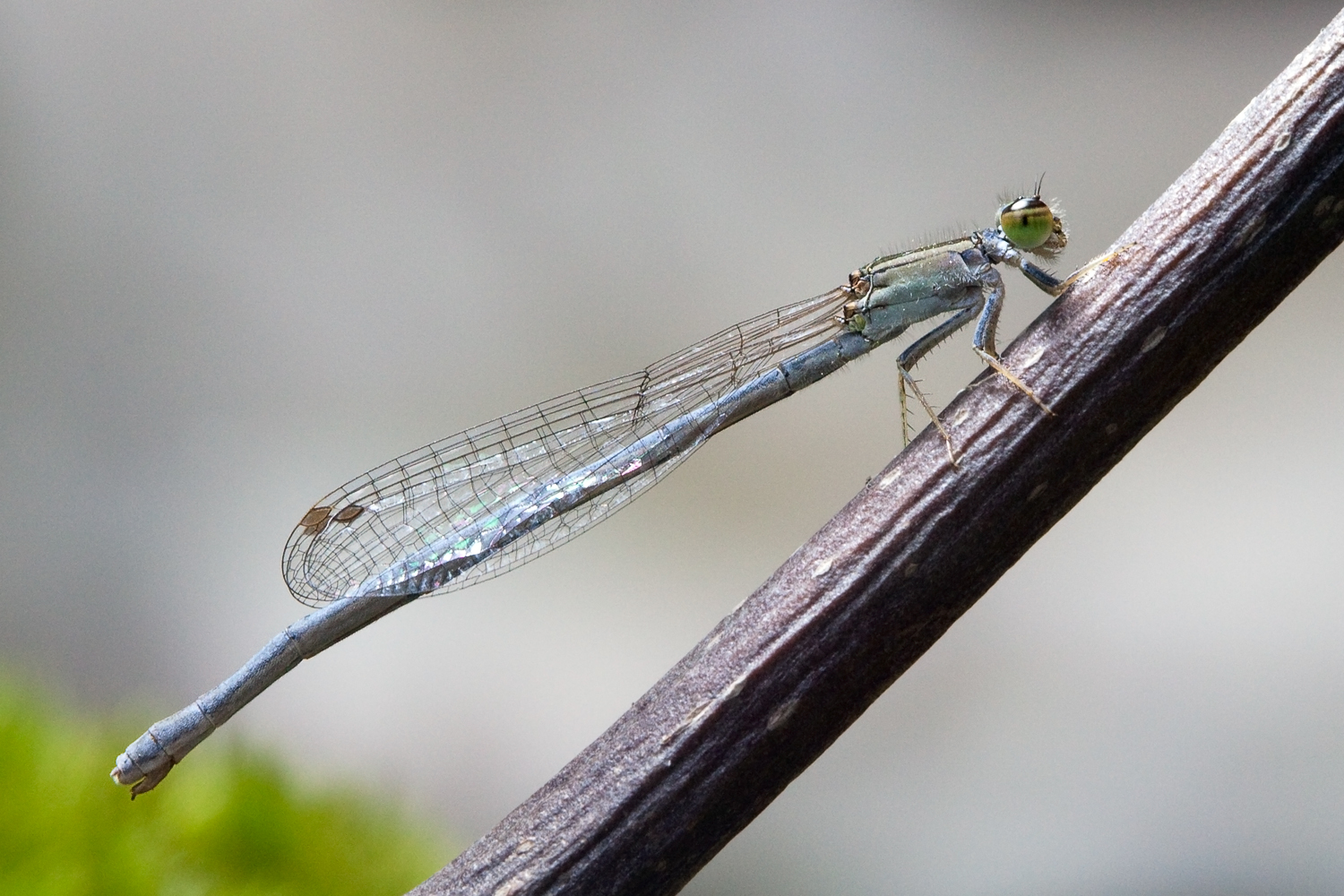
- Adult female

Conservation status
- Least Concern (IUCN 3.1)

Scientific classification
- Kingdom: Animalia
- Phylum: Arthropoda
- Clade: Pancrustacea
- Class: Insecta
- Order: Odonata
- Suborder: Zygoptera
- Family: Coenagrionidae
- Genus: Ischnura
- Species: I. verticalis

Binomial name
- Ischnura verticalis (Say, 1839)

= Eastern forktail =

Species of damselfly

The eastern forktail (Ischnura verticalis) is a species of damselfly in the family Coenagrionidae.

== Distribution and habitat ==
This species is present in the Eastern United States, from the Atlantic coast to the Midwest and from north of Florida to Southern Canada and west to Montana and New Mexico.

== Habitat ==
These damselflies inhabit various wetlands, especially small ponds, slow moving streams and marshes.

== Description ==
Ischnura verticalis can reach a body length of 22–30 millimetres (0.87–1.18 in). These small green, black and blue damselflies have a slender body with four wings folding over the back. The thorax of the males is black above, with pale green sides and green shoulder stripes. Eyes are dark above, greenish below. Abdomen is mainly black, with thin pale rings. The top of the abdomen (eighth and ninth abdominal segments) is blue, with black markings on sides. The males' abdomens shows tiny projections off the tip (hence the common name verticalis of this species).

Females are usually grayish-blue, with greyish markings on the abdomen. In the immature female, the thorax is bright orange with black dorsal and shoulder stripes. The abdomen is black above and orange below. Eyes are dark above, orange below. The pterostigma is white to light brown. The females may be less commonly yellow-green like the male.

This species is very similar to Ischnura perparva, or the Western Forktail. These two species can be better distinguished on the basis of their range.

== Biology ==
Adults typically fly from late June to early October, but in some locations may extend from early April to early November. Females are commonly monogamous, as they mate only once. They may fertilize over a thousand eggs with the sperm of a single male.

== Gallery ==
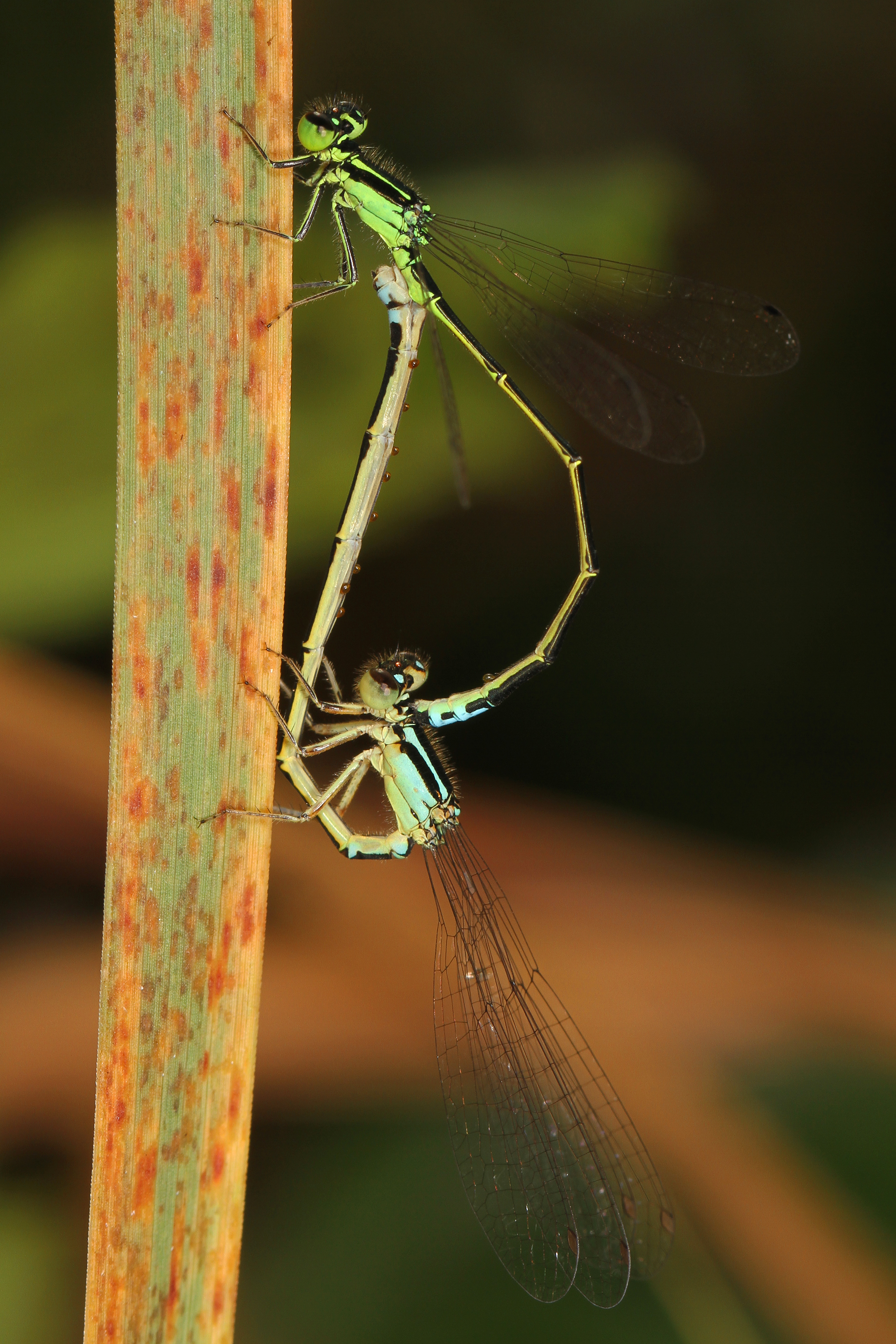
Eastern forktail damselfly mating wheel (male on right)

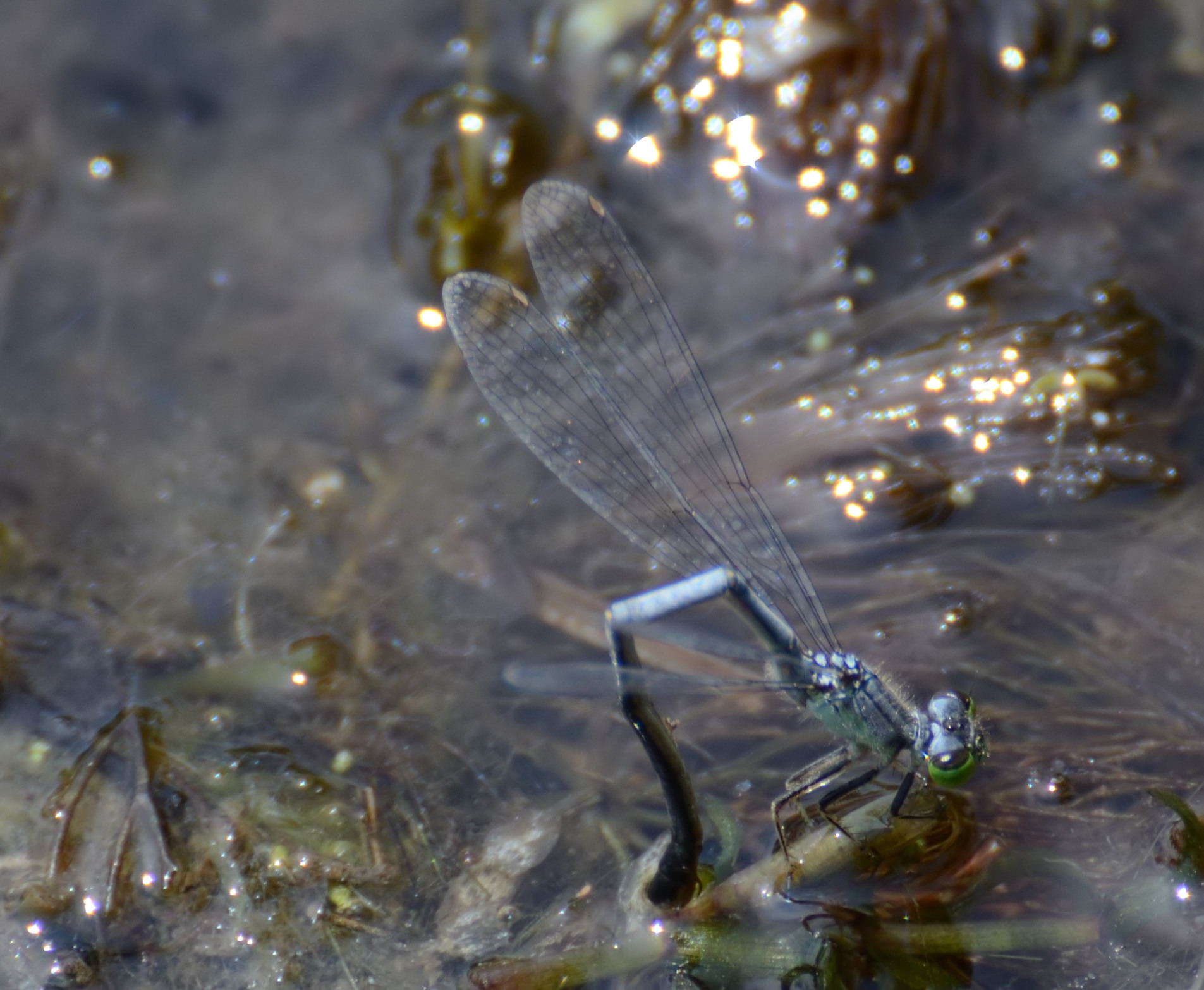
Eggs deposition

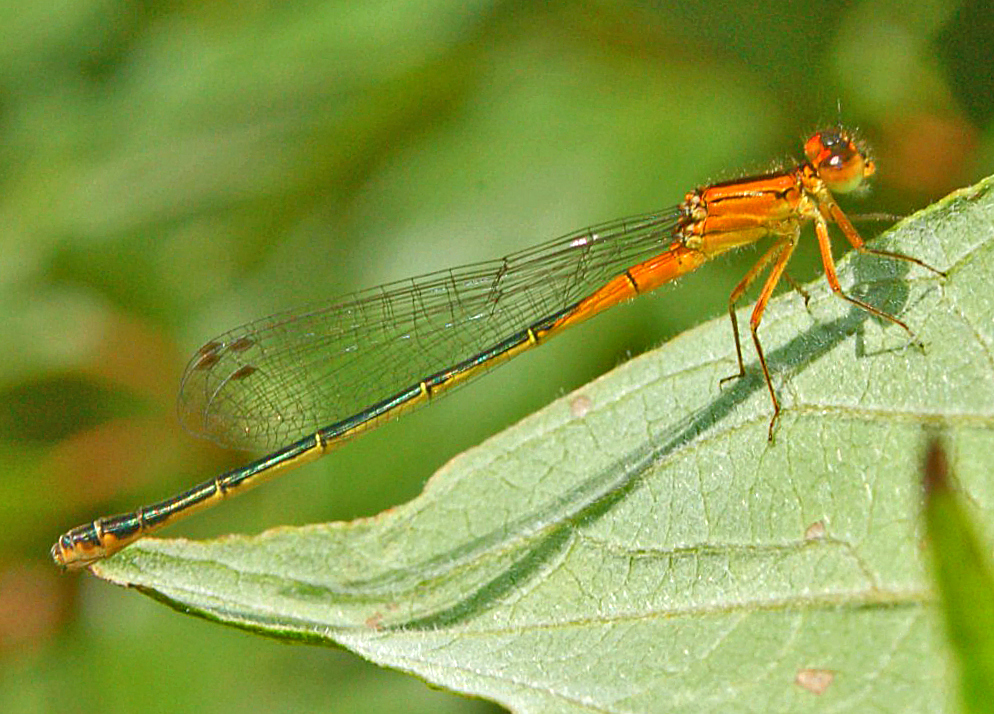
Immature female. The grayish-blue color develops with age

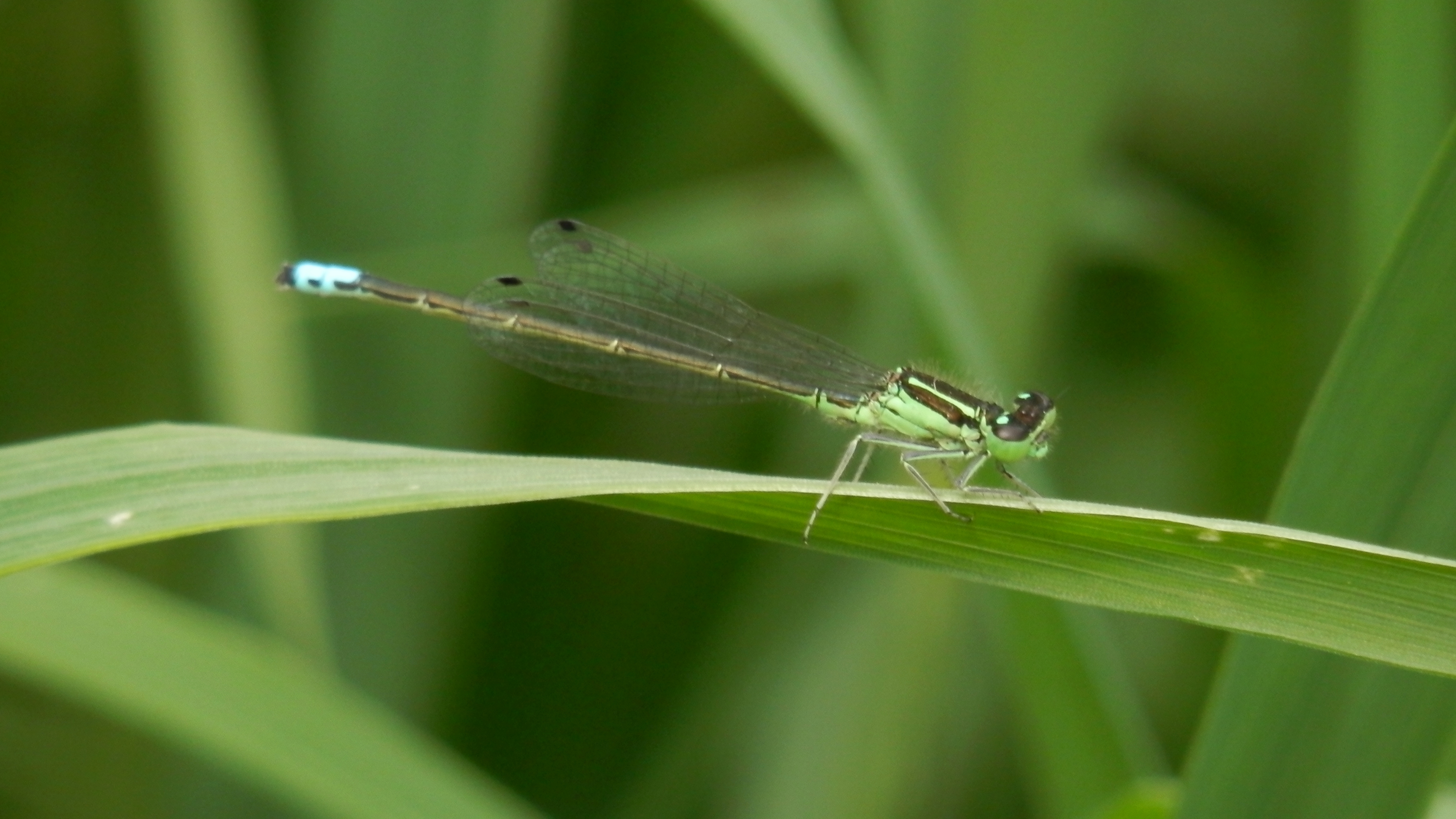
Male
