= Stunted growth =

Reduced growth rate in human development

- Other names: Stunting, nutritional stunting, linear growth retardation, linear growth faltering, linear growth failure
- World map in 2016 showing the percentage of children who are stunted in each country
- Specialty: Pediatrics

Stunted growth, also known as stunting, refers to impaired growth and development in children, which results in a lower than average height for the child's age. Stunted growth can develop due to a range of direct and indirect causes, often in the context of living in poverty and food insecurity. Causes include poor fetal growth in the womb (fetal growth restriction), unsafe sanitation, poor quality drinking water, childhood infections and diarrhea, malnutrition in the mother or the child.

Stunting is largely irreversible if occurring in the first 1000 days from conception to two years of age. Stunting increases the risk of death during childhood. Affected children generally do not recover lost height, and once stunting occurs, its effects are often long-lasting. Stunted children may experience worse cognitive development and poorer health in adulthood.

Among children under five years of age, the global stunting prevalence declined from 26.3% in 2012 to 22.3% in 2022 and 23.2% in 2024. It is projected that 19.5% of all children under five will be stunted in 2030. More than 85% of the world's stunted children live in Asia and Africa.

== Signs and symptoms ==
Malnutrition number of children who are stunted

Prevalence of stunting in children under 5 years by region

Stunted growth in children has the following public health impacts:

- Greater risk for illness and premature death
- Delayed cognitive development, and poor school performance
- Reduced intelligence quotient
- Future risk of obesity
- Women of shorter stature have a greater risk for complications during childbirth due to their smaller pelvis and are at risk of delivering a baby with low birth weight
- Stunted growth can be passed to the next generation, known as the "intergenerational cycle of malnutrition"

Early-life stunting can also lead to long-term developmental challenges. If a child is stunted at the age of 2, they tend to have a higher risk of poor cognitive and educational achievement in life, with subsequent socioeconomic and intergenerational consequences. Stunting might also lead to reductions in schooling, decreased economic productivity, and poverty. Stunted children also display higher risk of developing chronic non-communicable conditions such as diabetes and obesity as adults. If a stunted child undergoes substantial weight gain after age 2, this can lead to obesity. This is believed to be caused by metabolic changes produced by chronic malnutrition that can produce metabolic imbalances if the individual is exposed to excessive or poor quality diets as an adult. The development of obesity can lead to a higher risk of developing other related non-communicable diseases such as hypertension, coronary heart disease, metabolic syndrome, and stroke.

On a societal level, stunted individuals may have physical and/or cognitive delays, affecting their performance in their careers. Stunting can therefore limit economic development and productivity, and it has been estimated that it can affect a country's GDP by up to 3%.

Stunting is prevalent in the Global South and has severe consequences, including increased risk of infections and death. The global percentage of stunted growth decreased from 33% to 22.3% between 2000 and 2022. The largest drop took place in Asia, from 37.1% in 2000 to 28.2% in 2012 and 22.3% in 2022. Despite global progress, the prevalence of child stunting was greater than 30% in 28 countries in 2022 (most of which are in sub-Saharan Africa).

== Causes ==
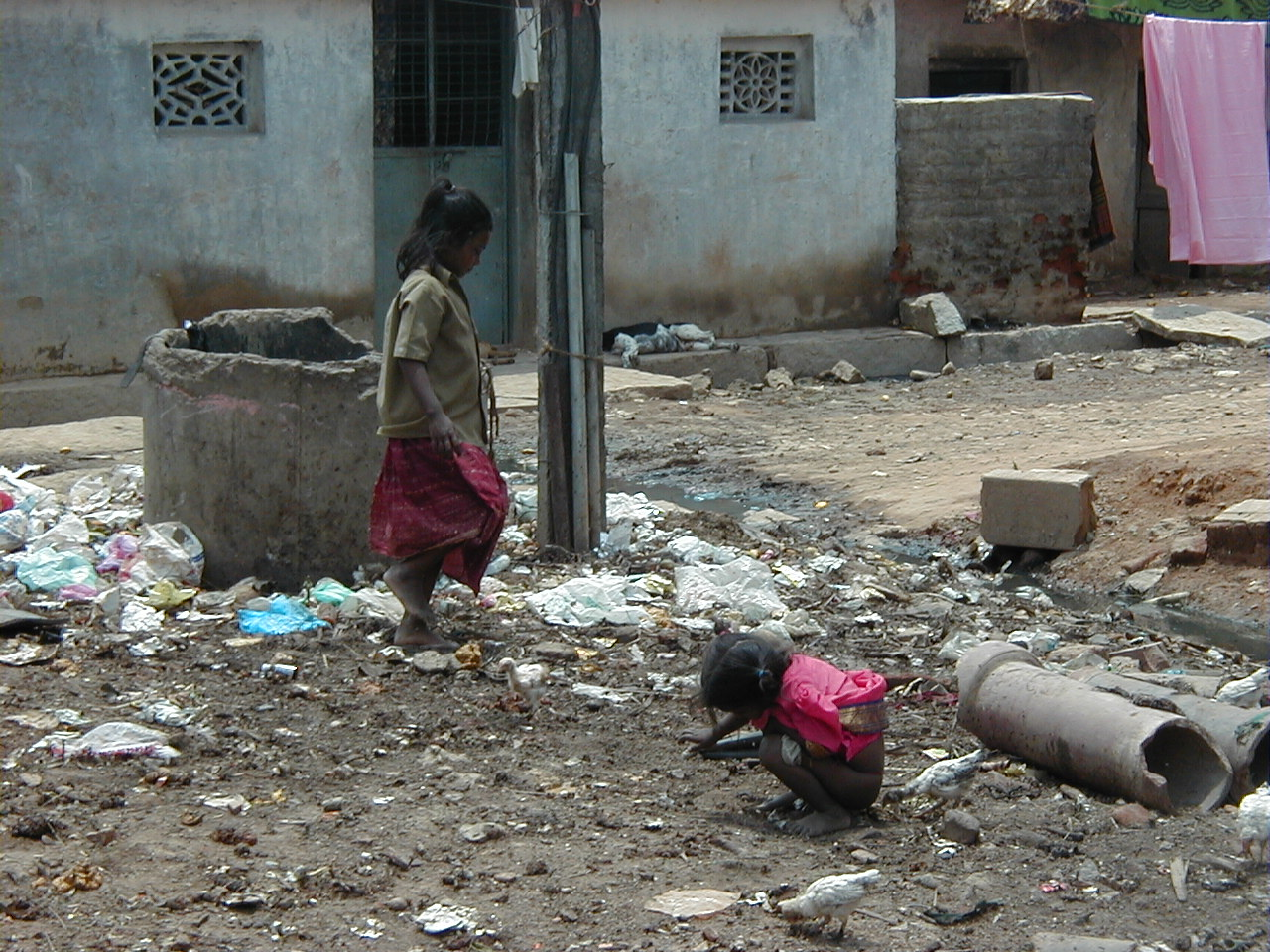
Children living in unsanitary conditions in an urban slum in India are at risk of diarrhea and stunted growth.

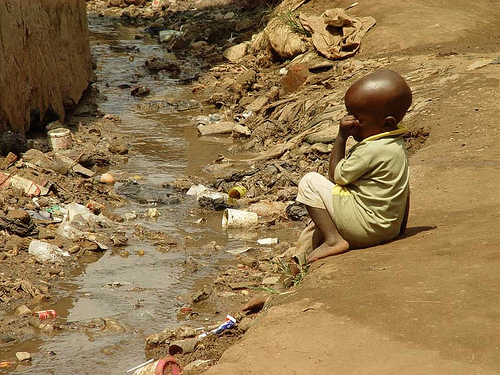
A child next to an open sewer in a slum in Kampala, Uganda.

Almost all stunting occurs within the 1,000-day period that spans from conception to a child's second birthday, which constitutes a window of opportunity for growth promotion. The recognition of prenatal factors underlines the intergenerational aspects of growth, and the need for early interventions. The three main causes of stunting in South Asia, and probably in most developing countries, are poor feeding practices, poor maternal nutrition, and poor sanitation. The leading risk factors for stunting are fetal growth restriction (birth weight below the 10th percentile) followed by unimproved sanitation and diarrhea. 22% of stunting cases can be attributed to environmental factors, while 14% to child nutrition. In addition, women's education, gender equality, the quantity and quality of foods available also play significant roles in stunting rates.

=== Feeding practices ===
Inadequate complementary child feeding and a general lack of vital nutrients besides pure caloric intake are some causes of stunted growth. Children need to be fed diets that meet the minimum requirements in terms of frequency and diversity to prevent undernutrition. Exclusive breastfeeding is recommended for the first six months of life and nutritious food alongside breastfeeding for children aged six months to two years old. Prolonged exclusive breastfeeding is associated with undernutrition because breast milk alone is nutritionally insufficient for children over six months old. Breastfeeding for a long time with inadequate complementary feeding leads to growth failure due to insufficient nutrients, which are essential for childhood development. The relationship between undernutrition and prolonged duration of breastfeeding is mostly observed among children from poor households with uneducated parents, as they are more likely to continue breastfeeding without meeting the minimum dietary diversity requirement.

=== Maternal nutrition ===
Poor maternal nutrition during pregnancy and breastfeeding can lead to stunted growth of children. Proper nutrition for mothers during the prenatal and postnatal period is important for ensuring healthy birth weight and healthy childhood growth. Prenatal causes of child stunting are associated with maternal undernutrition. Low maternal BMI predisposes the fetus to poor growth leading to intrauterine growth retardation, which is strongly associated with low birth weight and size. Women who are underweight or anemic during pregnancy are more likely to have stunted children, which perpetuates the intergenerational transmission of stunting. Children born with low birth weight are more at risk of stunting. However, the effect of prenatal undernutrition can be addressed during the postnatal period through proper child feeding practices.

Maternal undernutrition increases the risk of stunting at 2 years of age. 20% of stunting is attributed to being born small-for-gestational-age (SGA). An estimated 33% of stunting at 2 years was attributed to fetal growth restriction and preterm birth in 2011 in developing countries, and 41% in South Asia. Restricted pre- and postnatal growth are in turn important determinants of short adult height, increasing the likelihood of the next generation experiencing stunted growth.

=== Sanitation ===
One notable contribution to stunted growth is a lack of sanitation—an example of this is countries where public defecation is practiced. The ingestion of high quantities of fecal bacteria by young children through putting soiled fingers or household items in the mouth leads to intestinal infections. This affects children's nutritional status by diminishing appetite, reducing nutrient absorption, and increasing nutrient loss.

Around 25% of stunting cases could be attributed to five or more episodes of diarrhea before two years of age. Since diarrhea is closely linked with water, sanitation, and hygiene (WASH), this is a good indicator of the connection between WASH and stunted growth. To what extent improvements in drinking water safety, toilet use and good handwashing practices contribute to reducing stunting depending on how bad these practices were prior to interventions.

=== Environmental enteropathy ===
The condition termed environmental enteropathy is proposed as an immediate causal factor of childhood stunting. This is an asymptomatic small intestinal disorder characterized by chronic gut inflammation, reduced absorptive surface area, and disruption of intestinal barrier function. This small bowel disorder can be attributed to sustained exposure to intestinal pathogens caused by fecal contamination of food and water.

=== Land degradation ===
Southern Asia and sub-Saharan Africa are regions where land degradation coincide with high poverty rates and childhood stunting. In 2025, 47 million children under five years of age suffering from stunting live in areas where stunting overlaps with significant yield losses from land degradation. These areas represent a convergence of environmental degradation and human deprivation.

== Diagnosis ==
The international definition of childhood stunting is a child whose height-for-age value is at least two standard deviations below the median of the World Health Organization's (WHO) Child Growth Standards.

Growth stunting is identified by comparing measurements of children's heights to the WHO 2006 growth reference population: children who fall below the fifth percentile of the reference population in height for age are defined as stunted, regardless of the reason. The lower than fifth percentile corresponds to less than two standard deviations of the WHO Child Growth Standards median.

As an indicator of nutritional status, comparisons of children's measurements with growth reference curves may be used differently for populations of children than for individual children. The fact that an individual child falls below the fifth percentile for height for age on a growth reference curve may reflect normal variation in growth within a population: the individual child may be short simply because both parents carried genes for shortness and not because of inadequate nutrition. However, if substantially more than 5% of an identified child population have height for age that is less than the fifth percentile on the reference curve, then the population is said to have a higher-than-expected prevalence of stunting, and malnutrition is generally the first cause considered.

== Prevention ==
Three main factors are needed to reduce stunting:

- an environment where political commitment can thrive (also called an "enabling environment")
- applying several nutritional modifications or changes in a population on a large scale which have a high benefit and a low cost
- a strong foundation that can drive change (food security and a supportive health environment through increasing access to safe water and sanitation).

To prevent stunting, it is not just a matter of providing better nutrition but also access to clean water, improved sanitation (hygienic toilets), and hand washing at critical times (summarized as "WASH"). Without provision of toilets, prevention of tropical intestinal diseases, which may affect almost all children in the developing world and lead to stunting, will not be possible.

The underlying determinants can be ranked in terms of their potency in reducing child stunting:

1. percent of dietary energy from non-staple foods (greatest impact)
2. access to sanitation and women's education
3. access to safe water
4. per capita dietary energy supply

The first two of these determinants (access to sanitation and diversity of calorie sources from food supplies) need attention in particular because they have strongest impacts but are farthest from their desired levels.

The goal of UN agencies, governments, and NGOs is now to optimize nutrition during the first 1000 days of a child's life, from pregnancy to the child's second birthday, in order to reduce the prevalence of stunting. The first 1000 days in a child's life are a crucial "window of opportunity" because the brain develops rapidly, laying the foundation for future cognitive and social ability. Furthermore, it is also the time when young children are the most at risk of infections that lead to diarrhea. It is the time when they stop breast feeding (weaning process), begin to crawl, put things in their mouths and become exposed to fecal matter from open defecation and environmental enteropathies.

=== Diet ===
Previous interventions to reduce stunting have shown modest effects. Multiple micro-nutrient supplementation shows only small benefits for linear growth and results from studies supplementing lipid based nutrient supplements (LNS) to children are inconclusive. Educational interventions to improve complementary feeding may achieve behavioral change but have no or small effects on growth. Further, studies on the effect of micro-nutrient fortification, increased availability of key nutrients or increased energy density of complementary foods on stunting also show heterogeneous results. It is estimated that education interventions, if optimally designed and implemented, could reduce stunting by 0.6 z-scores while food-based interventions could reduce stunting by 0.5 z-scores, which is moderate compared to the average global growth deficit. Finally, the Lancet-series on maternal and child nutrition estimated that the impact of all existing interventions designed to improve nutrition and prevent related diseases in mothers and children, could reduce stunting at 3 years by merely 36%. Hence, factors explaining the shortfall in observed associations between child feeding practices and nutrient intake and linear growth, have increasingly been the focus of scientific interest.

Recent works showed promise that intervention with egg may improve linear growth in children. Comprehensive intervention package containing eggs also found to be effective in improving linear growth in children. However, the effect of egg intervention may not persist for longer period. Therefore, intervention programs should consider egg intervention for a longer period with emphasis on overall diet quality and improvement of environmental conditions.

=== Pregnant and lactating mothers ===
Ensuring proper nutrition of pregnant and lactating mothers is essential. Achieving so by helping women of reproductive age be in good nutritional status at conception is an excellent preventive measure. A focus on the pre-conception period has recently been introduced as a complement to the key phase of the 1000 days of pregnancy and first two years of life. An example of this are attempts to control anemia in women of reproductive age. A well-nourished mother is the first step of stunting prevention, decreasing chances of the baby being born of low birth-weight, which is the first risk factor for future malnutrition.

Balanced protein–energy supplementation in pregnancy seem to improve birth weight of children, with greater effects in undernourished women. Meanwhile, micronutrient supplements and lipid based nutrient supplements (LNS) (providing both macro-and micronutrients) during pregnancy have shown mixed effects on birth weight and -length. Similarly, studies supplementing LNS to mothers during pregnancy and lactation and their children during the complementary feeding period show heterogeneous results for stunting.

After birth, in terms of interventions for the child, early initiation of breastfeeding, together with exclusive breastfeeding for the first 6 months, are pillars of stunting prevention. Introducing proper complementary feeding after 6 months of age together with breastfeeding until age 2 is the next step.

=== Public health interventions ===
In summary, key public health interventions for the prevention of stunting are:

- Improvement in nutrition surveillance activities to identify rates and trends of stunting and other forms of malnutrition within countries. This should be done with an equity perspective, as it is likely that stunting rates will vary greatly between different population groups. The most vulnerable should be prioritized. The same should be done for risk factors such as anemia, maternal under-nutrition, food insecurity, low birthweight, breastfeeding practices etc. By collecting more detailed information, it is easier to ensure that policy interventions really address the root causes of stunting.
- Political will to develop and implement national targets and strategies in line with evidence-based international guidelines as well as contextual factors.
- Designing and implementing policies promoting nutritional and health well-being of mothers and women of reproductive age. The main focus should be on the 1000 days of pregnancy and first two years of life, but the pre-conception period should not be neglected as it can play a significant role in ensuring the fetus and baby's nutrition.
- Designing and implementing policies promoting proper breastfeeding and complementary feeding practice (focusing on diet diversity for both macro and micronutrients). This can ensure optimal infant nutrition as well as protection from infections that can weaken the child's body. Labor policy ensuring mothers have the chance to breastfeed should be considered where necessary.
- Introducing interventions addressing social and other health determinants of stunting, such as poor sanitation and access to drinking water, early marriages, intestinal parasite infections, malaria and other childhood preventable disease (referred to as "nutrition-sensitive interventions"), as well as the country's food security landscape. Interventions to keep adolescent girls in school can be effective at delaying marriage with subsequent nutritional benefits for both women and babies. Regulating milk substitutes is also very important to ensure that as many mothers as possible breastfeed their babies, unless a clear contraindication is present.
- Broadly speaking, effective policies to reduce stunting require multisectoral approaches, strong political commitment, community involvement and integrated service delivery.

=== International efforts ===
In 2015, the United Nations and its member states agreed on a new sustainable development agenda to promote prosperity and reduce poverty, putting forward 17 Sustainable Development Goals (SDGs) to be achieved by 2030. SDG 2 aims to "End hunger, achieve food security and improved nutrition, and promote sustainable agriculture". Sub-goal 2.2. aims to "by 2030 end all forms of malnutrition, including achieving by 2025 the internationally agreed targets on stunting and wasting in children under five years of age, and address the nutritional needs of adolescent girls, pregnant and lactating women, and older persons".

The Scaling Up Nutrition Movement (SUN) is the main network of governments, non-governmental and international organizations, donors, private companies and academic institutions working together in pursuit of improved global nutrition and a world without hunger and malnutrition. It was launched at the UN General Assembly of 2010 and it calls for country-led multi-sectoral strategies to address child malnutrition by scaling-up evidence-based interventions in both nutrition specific and sensitive areas. As of 2016, 50 countries have joined the SUN Movement with strategies that are aligned with international frameworks of action.

== Epidemiology ==
According to the World Health organization if less than 20% of the population is affected by stunting, this is regarded as "low prevalence" in terms of public health significance. Values of 40% or more are regarded as very high prevalence, and values in between as medium to high prevalence.

UNICEF has estimated that: "Globally, more than one quarter (26 percent) of children under 5 years of age were stunted in 2011 – roughly 165 million children worldwide." and "in sub-Saharan Africa, 40 per cent of children under 5 years of age are stunted; in South Asia, 39 per cent are stunted." The four countries with the highest prevalence are Timor-Leste, Burundi, Niger and Madagascar where more than half of children under 5 years old are stunted.

The UN's Food and Agriculture Organization (FAO) found that in 2019 22.5 percent of children under the age of five were stunted, 9.2 percent were wasted, and 9.9 percent were overweight across several Arab and North African countries.

=== Trends ===
==== Up to 1990s ====
Historical reconstructions suggest that child stunting was substantially more prevalent in the late nineteenth and early twentieth century than in the recent past from the 1980s onward. In the early 20th century, many countries that are now high-income had stunting rates comparable to those seen in low- and middle-income countries today. For example, parts of Western and Southern Europe exhibited relatively high levels of stunting (40-50%), while rates were exceptionally high in countries such as Japan and South Korea, in some cases exceeding 70%.

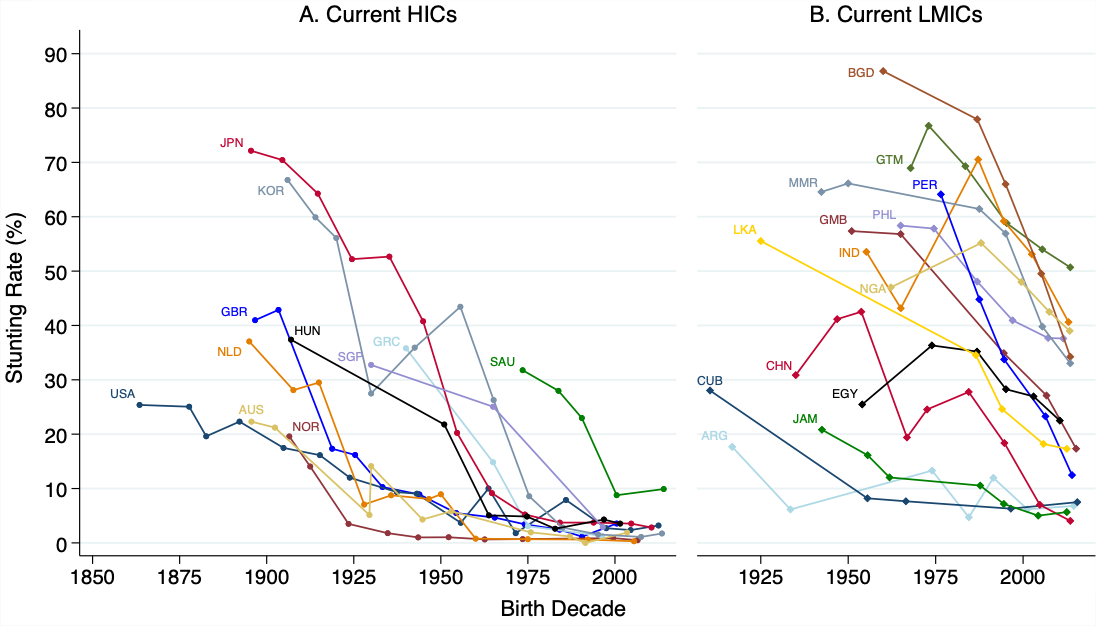
Comparison of historical stunting trends in high-income countries (HICs) and low- and middle-income countries (LMICs). Three-letter codes are standard country codes.

At the same time, there were considerable differences in stunting rates between regions. Stunting rates were relatively low in Scandinavia, European settler societies such as the United States and Australia, and parts of the Caribbean, while higher levels were observed in much of Europe and East Asia. Across the 20th century, however, stunting declined in most regions, forming a central component of the broader health transition associated with improvements in nutrition, sanitation, and disease environments.

These historical data indicate that the global burden of stunting was likely higher in the early 20th century than in 1985, when global estimates begin. The subsequent decline in stunting, particularly in now high-income countries, demonstrates that large reductions are possible over time, although the pace and timing of improvement varied widely across countries and regions.

==== 1990s to 2015 ====
As of 2015, an estimated 156 million children under the age of 5 years old in the world were stunted, 90% of them living in low and low-middle income countries. Roughly 56% of these children were in Asia and 37% in Africa. It is possible that some of these children concurrently had other forms of malnutrition, including wasting or being overweight. No statistics were available for these combined conditions. Stunting had been on the decline for the past 35 years - in 2016, there were 156 million stunted children, compared to 255 million in 1990. However, the decline of stunting was geographically uneven and unequal among different groups in society. Among children under five years of age, the global stunting prevalence declined from 26.3% in 2012 to 22.3% in 2022. It was projected that 19.5 percent of all children under five will be stunted in 2030.

Over the period 2000–2015, Asia saw a reduction in stunting prevalence from 38 to 24%; with Africa moving from 38 to 32%; along with Latin America and the Caribbean moving from 18 to 11%. This equated to a relative reduction of 36%, 17% and 39% respectively, indicating that Asia and Latin America and the Caribbean had displayed much larger reductions than Africa. Of these regions, Latin America and the Caribbean were on track to achieve global targets set with global initiatives such as United Nations Millennium Development Goals and World Health Assembly targets (see following section on global targets).

In Africa, the highest rates of stunting were observed in East Africa (37.5%). Other sub-regions also had high rates, with 32.1% in West Africa, 31.2% in Central Africa, and 28.4% in Southern Africa. North Africa is at 18%, and the Middle East at 16.2%. In Asia, the highest rate was observed in the south at 34.4%. South-East Asia is at 26.3%. Pacific Islands also displayed a high rate at 38.2%. Central and South America were at 15.6 and 9.9% respectively. South Asia, given its high population and high prevalence of stunting, was the region currently containing the highest absolute number of children with stunting.

The number of stunted children increased in Africa from 50.4 to 58.5 million from 2000 to 2015. This was despite the reduction in percentage prevalence of stunting and was due to the high rates of population growth. The data therefore indicates that the rate of reduction of stunting in Africa was able to counterbalance the increased number of growing children that fell into the trap of malnutrition due to population growth in the region, creating a cycle. This was also true in Oceania, unlike Asia and Latin America and the Caribbean where substantial absolute reductions in the number of stunted children were observed.

The reduction in stunting was closely linked to poverty reduction and the will and ability of governments to set up solid multisectoral approaches to reduce chronic malnutrition. Low income countries were the only group with more stunted children today than in the year 2000. Conversely, all other countries (high-income, upper-middle income, lower-middle income) achieved reductions in the numbers of stunted children. This perpetuated a cycle of poverty and malnutrition, whereby malnourished children were not able to maximally contribute to economic development as adults, and poverty increases chances of malnutrition.

==== 2015 to 2024 ====
By 2022, the number of stunted children under the age of 5 had gone down to 148.1 million (22% of children across the globe).

Between 2020 and 2021, the maximum statistics dropped from 60% in Burundi and 55% in several other countries, to 55% in Burundi and 50% in several other countries; the extreme rate of child morality had changed from 21% in Sierra Leone to 12% in Niger (according to UNICEF). The WHO has also noted that while global stunting rates have been reduced over time, the decline has slowed down in rural areas and areas experiencing crises.

The world has made progress to reduce child stunting, with a decrease in the prevalence from 26.4 percent in 2012 to 23.2 percent in 2024.

=== By country ===
==== Brazil ====
Brazil displayed a remarkable reduction in the rates of child stunting under age 5, from 37% in 1974, to 7.1% in 2007. This happened in association with impressive social and economic development that reduced the numbers of Brazilians living in extreme poverty (less than $1.25 per day) from 25.6% in 1990 to 4.8% in 2008. The successful reduction in child malnutrition in Brazil can be attributed to strong political commitment that led to improvements in the water and sanitation system, increased female schooling, scale-up of quality maternal and child health services, increased economic power at family level (including successful cash transfer programs), and improvements in food security throughout the country.

==== Bangladesh ====
Nearly one-third of the children under five years of age are stunted in Bangladesh and 9% are severely stunted. The country is on track in reducing the prevalence of stunted growth. If the current trend continues, the prevalence would be 21% in 2025, while the target is 27%. Maternal undernutrition and increased pathogen load in the intestine are the major risk factors of stunting in Bangladeshi children. Daily supplementation with egg, cow milk, and micronutrient powder found to be effective in improving linear growth of children in a community-based trial in Bangladesh.

==== Peru ====
After a decade (i.e., 1995–2005) in which stunting rates stagnated in the country, Peru designed and implemented a national strategy against child malnutrition called crecer ("grow"), which complemented a social development conditional cash-transfer program called juntos that included a nutritional component. The strategy was multisectoral in that it involved the health, education, water, sanitation and hygiene, agriculture and housing sectors and stakeholders. It was led by the Government and the Prime Minister himself, and included non-governmental partners at both central, regional and community level. After the strategy was implemented, stunting went from 22.9% to 17.9% (2005–2010), with very significant improvements in rural areas where it had been more difficult to reduce stunting rates in the past.

==== India ====
The State of Maharashtra in Central-Western India has been able to produce a large reduction in stunting rates in children under 2 years of age from 44% to 22.8% in the period from 2005 to 2012. This is particularly remarkable given the immense challenges India has faced to address malnutrition, and that the country hosts almost half of all stunted children under 5 in the world. This was achieved through integrated community-based programs that were designed by a central advisory body that promoted multisectoral collaboration, provided advice to policymakers on evidence-based solutions, and advocated for the key role of the 1000 days (pregnancy and first two years of life).

==== Nepal ====
In Nepal, short maternal stature, low maternal education, poor access to health services and poverty are strong determinants for stunting. However, in Nepal, stunting has decreased from 57% in 2001 to 36% in 2016, with lower prevalence in urban than in rural settings.

==== Philippines ====
In the Philippines, one in three children below five years old is stunted. Even though the country's economic growth has steadily increased by 4% annually, almost a third of Filipino children have stunted growth. The prevalence of stunting declined during the early 2000s but has remained the same since then, with the 2019 rate (28.8 percent) only marginally lower than that of 2008. Researchers attribute the problem to micro-nutrient deficiencies brought on by poverty, maternal under-education, food insecurity, and poor environmental conditions. To address stunting and other health and food security issues, the Philippine Plan of Action for Nutrition (PPAN) was established as an umbrella initiative to meet health and nutrition targets in the country by 2028. Since 2015, there has been a decline in stunting across all age groups, from infants to teenagers, with the most significant improvement observed among 5 to 10-year-olds, dropping from 31.2 percent in 2015 to 19.7 percent in 2021.

== Research ==
The Water and Sanitation Program of the World Bank has investigated links between lack of sanitation and stunting in Vietnam and Lao PDR. An example is in Vietnam where the lack of sanitation in rural villages in mountainous regions of Vietnam led to five-year-old children being 3.7 cm shorter than healthy children living in villages with good access to sanitation. This difference in height is irreversible and matters a great deal for a child's cognitive development and future productive potential.

=== Review articles ===
The Lancet has published two comprehensive series on maternal and child nutrition, in 2008 and 2013. The series review the epidemiology of global malnutrition and analyze the state of the evidence for cost-effective interventions that should be scaled up to achieve impact and global targets. In the first of such series, investigators define the importance of the 1000 day and identify child malnutrition as being responsible for one third of all child deaths worldwide. This finding is key in that it points at malnutrition as a key determinant of child mortality that is often overlooked. When a child dies of pneumonia, malaria or diarrhea (some of the causes of child mortality in the world), it may well be that malnutrition is a key contributing factor that prevents the body from successfully fighting the infection and recovering from these diseases.

In the follow-up series in 2013, the focus on undernutrition is expanded to the increasing burden of obesity in high-, middle- and low-income countries. Several countries with high levels of child stunting and undernutrition are starting to display worrisome increasing trends of child obesity concurrently, due to increased wealth and the persistence of significant inequalities. The challenges these countries face are particularly difficult as they require intervening on two levels on what has come to be called "double burden of malnutrition". As an example, in India 30% of children under 5 years of age are stunted, and 20% are overweight. Neglecting these nutritional problems is not an option anymore if countries are to escape poverty traps and provide opportunities to their people to live fulfilling productive lives without stunting.

Nutritional interventions such as dietary supplementation and nutritional education have the potential to decrease stunting.

== See also ==
- Compensatory growth
- Failure to thrive
- Food security
- Global Alliance for Improved Nutrition
- Undernutrition in children

== Sources ==
This article incorporates text from a free content work. Licensed under CC BY 4.0. Text taken from The State of Food Security and Nutrition in the World 2024, FAO, IFAD, UNICEF, WFP and WHO, FAO.

This article incorporates text from a free content work. Licensed under CC BY 4.0 (license statement/permission). Text taken from The State of Food Security and Nutrition in the World 2025, Food and Agriculture Organization of the United Nations.

This article incorporates text from a free content work. Licensed under CC BY 4.0 (license statement/permission). Text taken from The State of Food and Agriculture 2025, Food and Agriculture Organization of the United Nations.
