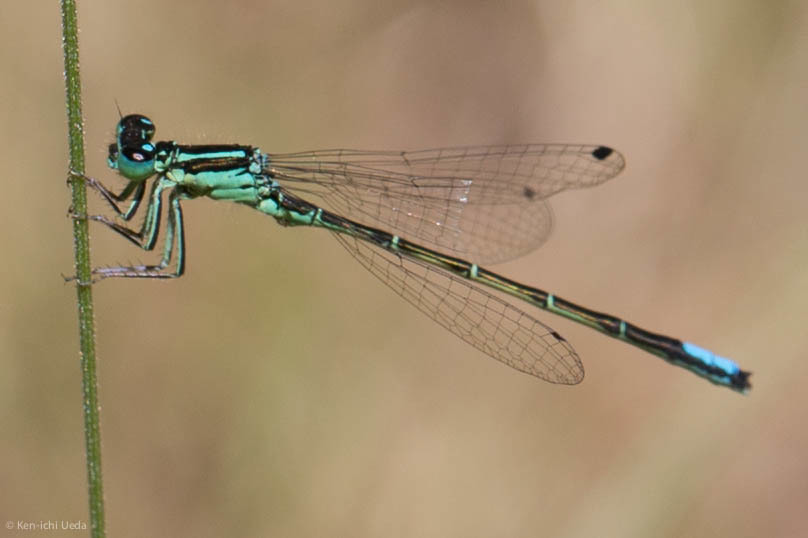
- male

Conservation status
- Least Concern (IUCN 3.1)

Scientific classification
- Kingdom: Animalia
- Phylum: Arthropoda
- Clade: Pancrustacea
- Class: Insecta
- Order: Odonata
- Suborder: Zygoptera
- Family: Coenagrionidae
- Genus: Ischnura
- Species: I. perparva

Binomial name
- Ischnura perparva McLachlan in Selys, 1876

= Ischnura perparva =

Species of damselfly

Ischnura perparva, the western forktail, is a species of narrow-winged damselfly in the family Coenagrionidae. It is found in North America.

The IUCN conservation status of Ischnura perparva is "LC", least concern, with no immediate threat to the species' survival. The population is stable. The IUCN status was reviewed in 2017.

Ischnura perparva is most closely related to I. cervula, and belongs to a clade of damselflies that also includes I. verticalis, I. posita, I. damula, and I. demorsa.

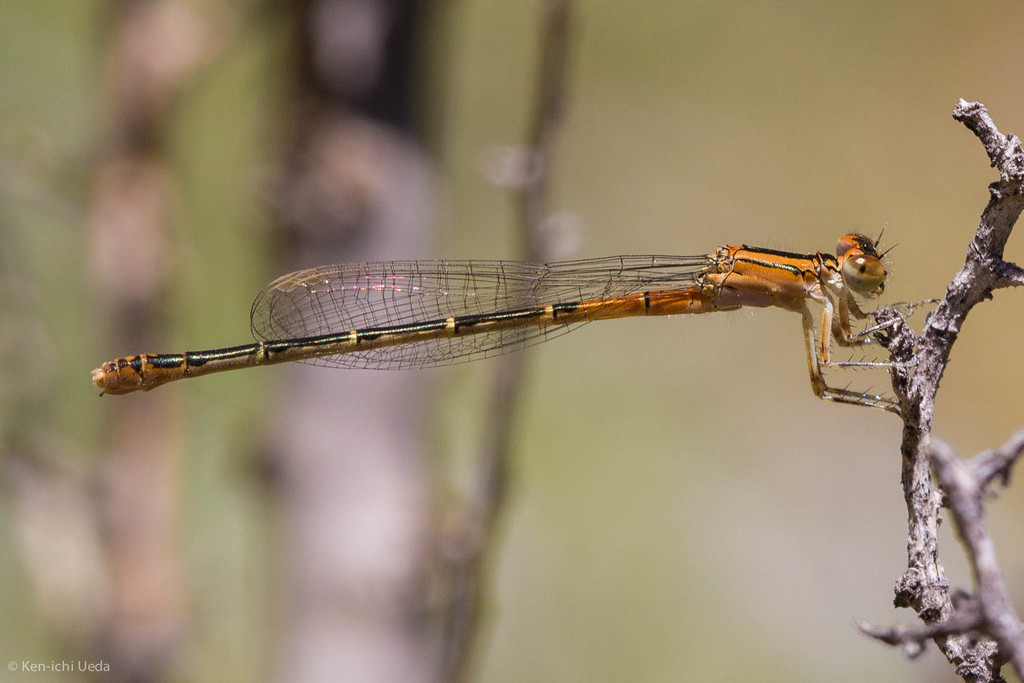
immature female

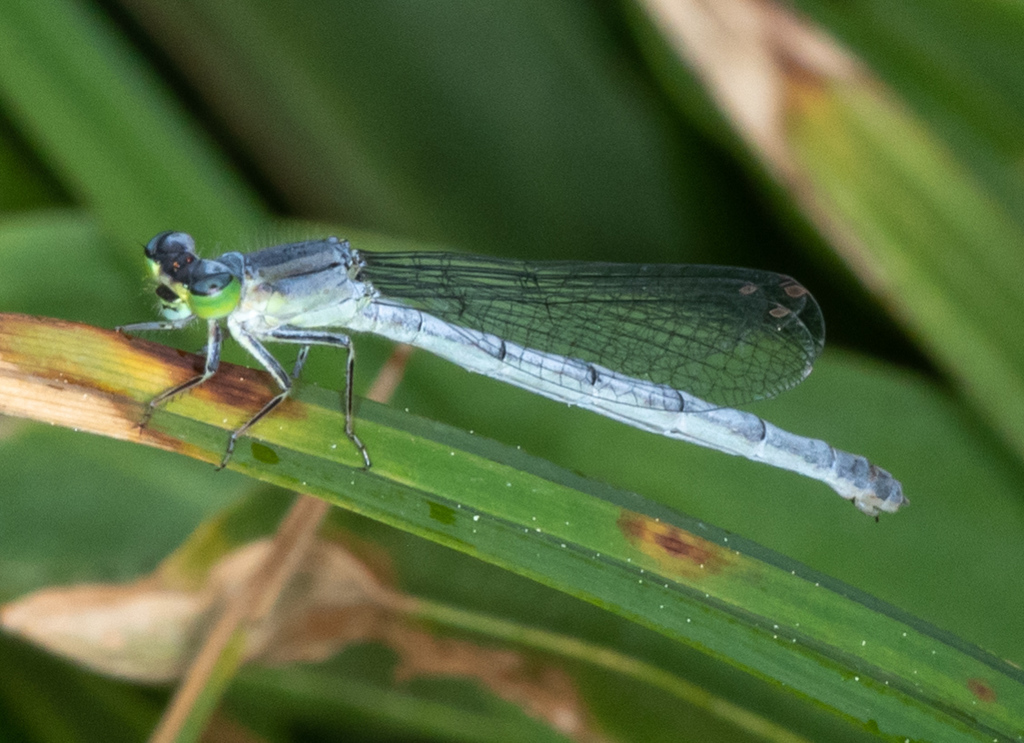
mature female
