= Infant mortality =

Death of children under the age of 1

Infant mortality rate

Number of infant deaths

Infant mortality is the death of an infant before its first birthday. The occurrence of infant mortality in a population can be described by the infant mortality rate (IMR), which is the number of deaths of infants under one year of age per 1,000 live births. Similarly, the child mortality rate, also known as the under-five mortality rate, compares the death rate of children up to the age of five.

Leading causes of infant mortality include birth asphyxia, pneumonia, neonatal infection, diarrhea, malaria, measles, malnutrition, term birth complications such as abnormal presentation of the fetus, umbilical cord prolapse, or prolonged labor. One of the most common preventable causes of infant mortality is smoking during pregnancy. Lack of prenatal care, alcohol consumption during pregnancy, and drug use also cause complications that may result in infant mortality. Many situational factors contribute to the infant mortality rate, such as the pregnant woman's level of education, environmental conditions, political infrastructure, and level of medical support. Improving sanitation, access to clean drinking water, immunization against infectious diseases, and other public health measures can help reduce rates of infant mortality.

In 1990, 8.8 million infants younger than one-year-old died globally out of 12.6 million child deaths under the age of five. More than 60% of the deaths of children under-five are seen as avoidable with low-cost measures such as continuous breastfeeding, vaccinations, and improved nutrition. The global under-five mortality rate in 1950 was 22.5%, which dropped to 4.5% in 2015. Over the same period, the infant mortality rate declined from 65 deaths per 1,000 live births to 29 deaths per 1,000. Globally, 5.4 million children died before their fifth birthday in 2017; by 2021 that number had dropped to 5 million children.

The child mortality rate (not the infant mortality rate) was an indicator used to monitor progress towards the Fourth Goal of the Millennium Development Goals of the United Nations for the year 2015. A reduction in child mortality was established as a target in the Sustainable Development Goals—Goal Number 3: Ensure healthy lives and promote well-being for all at all ages. As of January 2022, an analysis of 200 countries found 133 already meeting the SDG target, with 13 others trending towards meeting the target by 2030. Throughout the world, the infant mortality rate (IMR) fluctuates drastically, and according to Biotechnology and Health Sciences, education and life expectancy in a country are the leading indicators of IMR. This study was conducted across 135 countries over the course of 11 years, with the continent of Africa having the highest infant mortality rate of any region studied, with 68 deaths per 1,000 live births.

== Classification ==
Infant mortality rate (IMR) is the number of deaths per 1,000 live births of children under one year of age. The rate for a given region is the number of children dying under one year of age, divided by the number of live births during the year, multiplied by 1,000.

Forms of infant mortality:

- Perinatal mortality is late fetal death (22 weeks gestation to birth) or death of a newborn up to one week postpartum.
- Neonatal mortality is death occurring within 28 days postpartum. Neonatal death is often attributed to inadequate access to basic medical care, during pregnancy and after delivery. This accounts for 40–60% of infant mortality in developing countries.
- Postneonatal mortality is the death of children aged 29 days to one year. The major contributors to postneonatal death are malnutrition, infectious disease, pregnancy complications, sudden infant death syndrome, and problems in the home environment.

== Causes ==
Causes of infant mortality, or direct causes of death, differ from contributions to the IMR, as contributing factors raise the risk of death, but do not directly cause death. Environmental and social barriers that prevent access to basic medical resources contribute to an increased infant mortality rate, 86% of infant deaths are caused by infections, premature births, complications during delivery, perinatal asphyxia, and birth injuries. Many of these common causes are preventable with low-cost measures. While 99% of infant deaths occur in developing countries, the greatest percentage reduction in infant mortality occurs in countries that already have low rates of infant mortality. In the United States, a primary source of infant mortality risk is infant birth weight, with lower birth weights increasing the risk; the causes of low birth weight include socioeconomic, psychological, behavioral, and environmental factors.

=== Main causes ===
There are three main leading causes of infant mortality: conditions related to preterm birth, congenital anomalies, and SIDS (sudden infant death syndrome). In North Carolina between 1980 and 1984, 37.5% of infant deaths were due to prematurity, congenital anomalies accounted for 17.4% and SIDS accounted for 12.9%.

==== Premature birth ====
Premature, or preterm birth (PTB), is defined as birth before a gestational age of 37 weeks, as opposed to full term birth at 40 weeks. This can be further sub-divided in various ways, one being: "mild preterm (32–36 weeks), very preterm (28–31 weeks) and extremely preterm (<28 weeks)". A lower gestational age increases the risk of infant mortality.

Between 1990 and 2010 prematurity was the second leading cause of worldwide mortality for neonates and children under the age of five. The overall PTB mortality rate in 2010 was 11.1% (15 million deaths) worldwide and was highest in low to middle-income countries in sub-Saharan Africa and south Asia (60% of all PTBs), compared with high-income countries in Europe or the United States. Low-income countries also have limited resources to care for the needs of preterm infants, which increases the risk of infant mortality. The survival rate in these countries for infants born before 28 weeks of gestation is 10%, compared with a 90% survival rate in high-income countries. In the United States, the period from 1980 to 2000 saw a decrease in the total number of infant mortality cases, despite a significant increase in premature births.

Based on distinct clinical presentations, there are three main subgroups of preterm births: those that occur due to spontaneous premature labor, those that occur due to spontaneous membrane (amniotic sac) rupture, and those that are medically induced. Both spontaneous factors are viewed to be a result of similar causes; hence, two main classifications remain: spontaneous and medically induced causes. The risk of spontaneous PTB increases with "extremes of maternal age (both young and old), short inter-pregnancy intervals, multiple gestations, assisted reproductive technology, prior PTB, family history, substance abuse, cigarette use, low maternal socioeconomic status, late or no prenatal care, low maternal prepregnancy weight, bacterial vaginosis, periodontal disease, and poor pregnancy weight gain." Medically induced preterm birth is often conducted when continuing pregnancy poses significant risks to the pregnant parent or fetus; the most common causes include preeclampsia, diabetes, maternal medical conditions, fetal distress, or developmental problems. Despite these risk factors, the underlying causes of premature infant death are often unknown, and approximately 65% of all cases are not associated with any known risk factor.

Infant mortality caused by premature birth is mainly attributed to developmental immaturity, which impacts multiple organ systems in the infant's body. The main body systems affected include the respiratory system, which may result in pulmonary hypoplasia, respiratory distress syndrome, bronchopulmonary dysplasia (a chronic lung disease), and apnea. Other body systems that fully develop at a later gestational age include the gastrointestinal system, the skin, the immune system, the cardiovascular system, and the hematologic system. Poor development of these systems increases the risk of infant mortality.

Understanding the biological causes and predictors of PTB is important for identifying and preventing premature birth and infant mortality. While the exact mechanisms responsible for inducing premature birth are often unknown, many of the underlying risk factors are associated with inflammation. Approximately "80% of preterm births that occur at <1,000 g or at <28 to 30 weeks of gestation" have been associated with inflammation. Biomarkers of inflammation, including C-reactive protein, ferritin, various interleukins, chemokines, cytokines, defensins, and bacteria, have been shown to be associated with increased risks of infection or inflammation-related preterm birth. Biological fluids have been utilized to analyze these markers in hopes of understanding the pathology of preterm birth, but they are not always useful if not acquired at the appropriate gestational time-frame. For example, biomarkers such as fibronectin are accurate predictors of premature birth at over 24 weeks of gestation but have poor predictive values before then. Additionally, understanding the risks associated with different gestational ages is a helpful determiner of Gestational age-specific mortality.

==== Sudden infant death syndrome ====
Sudden infant death syndrome (SIDS) is defined as the sudden death of an infant less than one year of age with no cause detected after a thorough investigation. SIDS is more common in Western countries. The United States Centers for Disease Control and Prevention report SIDS to be the leading cause of death in infants aged one month to one year of life. Even though researchers are not sure what causes SIDS, they have found that putting babies to sleep on their backs, instead of their stomachs, lowers the risk. Campaigns like Back to Sleep have used this research to lower the SIDS death rate by 50%. Though the exact cause is unknown, the "triple-risk model" presents three factors that together may contribute to SIDS: smoking while pregnant, the age of the infant, and stress from conditions such as prone sleeping, co-sleeping, overheating, and covering of the face or head. In the early 1990s, it was argued that immunizations could contribute to an increased risk of SIDS; however, more recent support the idea that vaccinations reduce the risk of SIDS.

In the United States, approximately 3,500 infant deaths are sleep-related, a category that includes SIDS. To reduce sleep-related infant deaths, the American Academy of Pediatrics recommends providing infants with safe-sleeping environments, breastfeeding, and immunizing according to the recommended immunization schedule. They recommend the use of a pacifier and recommend avoiding exposure to smoke, alcohol, and illicit drugs during and after pregnancy.

==== Congenital malformations ====
Congenital malformations are present at birth and include conditions such as cleft lip and palate, Down Syndrome, and heart defects. Some congenital malformations may be more likely when the mother consumes alcohol, but they can also be caused by genetics or unknown factors. Congenital malformations have had a significant impact on infant mortality, but malnutrition and infectious diseases remain the main causes of death in less developed countries. For example, in the Caribbean and Latin America in the 1980s, congenital malformations only accounted for 5% of infant deaths, while malnutrition and infectious diseases accounted for 7% to 27% of infant deaths. In more developed countries, such as the United States, there was a rise in infant deaths due to congenital malformations, mostly heart and central nervous system problems. In the 20th century, there was a decrease in the number of infant deaths from heart conditions, from 1979 to 1997, there was a 39% decline.

=== Medicine and biology ===
Causes of infant mortality and deaths that are related to medical conditions include: low birth weight, sudden infant death syndrome, malnutrition, congenital malformations, infectious diseases, and low income for health care, including neglected tropical diseases.

The American Academy of Pediatrics recommends that infants need multiple doses of vaccines such as diphtheria–tetanus–acellular pertussis vaccine, Haemophilus influenzae type b (Hib) vaccine, hepatitis B (HepB) vaccine, inactivated polio vaccine (IPV), and pneumococcal vaccine (PCV). Research conducted by the Institute of Medicine's Immunization Safety Review Committee concluded that there is no relationship between these vaccines and the risk of SIDS in infants.

==== Low birth weight ====
Low birth weight makes up 60–80% of the infant mortality rate in developing countries. The New England Journal of Medicine stated that "The lowest mortality rates occur among infants weighing 3,000 to 3,500 g (6.6 to 7.7 lb). For infants born weighing 2,500 g (5.5 lb) or less, the mortality rate rapidly increases with decreasing weight, and most of the infants weighing 1,000 g (2.2 lb) or less die. As compared with normal-birth-weight infants, those with low weight at birth are almost 40 times more likely to die in the neonatal period; for infants with very low weight at birth the relative risk of neonatal death is almost 200 times greater." Infant mortality due to low birth weight is usually a direct cause stemming from other medical complications such as preterm birth, poor maternal nutritional status, a lack of prenatal care, maternal sickness during pregnancy, and unhygienic home environments. Birth weight and the length of gestation are the two most important predictors of an infant's chances of survival and their overall health.

According to the New England Journal of Medicine, "in the past two decades, the infant mortality rate (deaths under one year of age per thousand live births) in the United States has declined sharply." The rate of low birth weights among African Americans remains twice as high as the rate for white people. Low birth weight, the leading cause of infant deaths, is preventable by effective programs to help prevent low birth weight are a combination of health care, education, the environment,mental modification, and public policy. Preterm birth is the leading cause of newborn deaths worldwide. Even though America has a higher survival rate for premature infants, the percentage of Americans who deliver prematurely is comparable to those in developing countries. Reasons for this include teenage pregnancy, an increase in pregnancy after the age of 35, an increase in the use of in vitro fertilisation (which increases the risk of multiple births), obesity, and diabetes. Also, pregnant people who do not have access to health care are less likely to visit a doctor, therefore increasing their risk of delivering prematurely.

==== Malnutrition ====
Global Hunger Index

Malnutrition or undernutrition is defined as inadequate intake of nourishment, such as proteins and vitamins, which adversely affects the growth, energy, and development of people all over the world. It is especially prevalent during pregnancy and in infants and children under 5 who live in developing countries within the poorer regions of Africa, Asia, and Latin America. Children are especially vulnerable as they have yet to fully develop a strong immune system and are dependent on their parents to provide the necessary food and nutritional intake. It is estimated that about 3.5 million children die each year as a result of childhood or maternal malnutrition, with stunted growth, low body weight, and low birth weight accounting for about 2.2 million associated deaths. Socioeconomic and environmental factors contribute to malnutrition, as do gender, location, and cultural practices surrounding breastfeeding. It is difficult to assess the most pressing factor as they can intertwine and vary among regions.

Children suffering from malnutrition can become underweight, and experience stunting or wasting. In Africa, the number of stunted children has risen, while Asia has the most children under 5 suffering from wasting. Inadequate nutrients adversely affect physical and cognitive development, increasing susceptibility to severe health problems. Micronutrient deficiency has been linked to anemia, fatigue, blindness, goiter, poor brain development, and death. Malnutrition also decreases the immune system's ability to fight infections, resulting in higher rates of death from diseases such as malaria, respiratory disease, and diarrhea.

Folic acid during pregnancy is one way to combat iron deficiency. A few public health measures used to lower levels of iron deficiency anemia include added iodine to salt or drinking water and including vitamin A and multivitamin supplements in the diet. A deficiency of this vitamin causes certain types of anemia (low red blood cell count).

==== Infectious diseases ====
Babies born in low- to middle-income countries in sub-Saharan Africa and southern Asia are at the highest risk of neonatal death. Bacterial infections of the bloodstream, lungs, and the brain's covering (meningitis) are responsible for 25% of neonatal deaths worldwide. Newborns can acquire infections during birth from bacteria present in the birth canal, the person may not be aware of the infection, or they may have an untreated pelvic inflammatory disease or a sexually transmitted disease. These bacteria can also move up the vaginal canal into the amniotic sac surrounding the baby causing in utero transmission. Maternal blood-borne infection is another route of bacterial infection. Neonatal infection is more likely with the premature rupture of the membranes (PROM) of the amniotic sac.

Seven out of ten childhood deaths are due to infectious diseases like acute respiratory infection, diarrhea, measles, and malaria. Acute respiratory infections such as pneumonia, bronchitis, and bronchiolitis account for 30% of childhood deaths; 95% of pneumonia cases occur in the developing world. Diarrhea is the second-largest cause of childhood mortality in the world, while malaria causes 11% of childhood deaths. Measles is the fifth-largest cause of childhood mortality.

=== Environmental ===
The infant mortality rate is one measure of a nation's health and social conditions. Its causes are a composite of a number rates that each have their own separate relationships with each other and with various other social factors. As such, IMR can often be seen as an indicator to measure the level of socioeconomic disparity within a country.

Organic water pollution is a better indicator of infant mortality than health expenditures per capita. Water contaminated by animal waste houses various pathogens including a host of parasitic and microbial infections. Areas of low socioeconomic status are more prone to inadequate plumbing infrastructure and poorly maintained facilities. Climate and geography often play a role in sanitation conditions. For example, the inaccessibility of clean water exacerbates poor sanitation conditions.

The burning of inefficient fuels doubles the rate of acute respiratory tract infections in children under 5 years old. People who live in areas where particulate matter air pollution is higher tend to have more health problems regardless of age. The short and long-term effects of air pollution are associated with an increased mortality rate, including infant mortality. Air pollution is consistently associated with postnatal mortality due to respiratory effects and sudden infant death syndrome (SIDS). Specifically, air pollution is highly associated with SIDS in the United States during the post-neonatal stage. High infant mortality is exacerbated because newborns are a vulnerable subgroup that is affected by air pollution. Newborns who were born into these environments are no exception, and pregnant women exposed to greater air pollution on a daily basis should be closely watched by their doctors, including after the baby is born. Babies who live in areas with less air pollution have a greater chance of living until their first birthday, meaning babies who live in environments with more air pollution are at greater risk for infant mortality. Areas that have higher air pollution also have a greater chance of having a higher population density, higher crime rates, and lower income levels, all of which can lead to higher infant mortality rates.

A key pollutant in infant mortality rates is carbon monoxide. Carbon monoxide is a colorless, odorless gas that can kill, and is especially dangerous to infants because of their immature respiratory systems. Another major pollutant that can have detrimental effects on a fetus is second-hand smoke.

[I]n 2006, more than 42,000 Americans died of secondhand smoke-attributable diseases, including more than 41,000 adults and nearly 900 infants. Fully 36% of the infants who died of low birth weight caused by exposure to maternal smoking in utero were black, as were 28% of those dying of respiratory distress syndrome, 25% dying of other respiratory conditions, and 24% dying of sudden infant death syndrome.

— American Journal of Public Health

Compared with nonsmoking women having their first birth, women who smoked less than one pack of cigarettes per day had a 25% greater risk of mortality, and those who smoked one or more packs per day had a 56% greater risk. Among women having their second or higher birth, smokers experienced 30% greater mortality than nonsmokers.

— The American Journal of Epidemiology

Modern research in the United States into racial disparities in infant mortality suggests a link between institutionalized racism and high rates of African American infant mortality. In synthesis of this research, it has been observed that "African American infant mortality remains elevated due to the social arrangements that exist between groups and the lifelong experiences responding to the resultant power dynamics of these arrangements."

Infant mortality rates do not decline among African Americans if their socioeconomic status improves. Parker Dominguez at the University of Southern California has made some headway in determining the reasons behind this, claiming black women in the US are more prone to psychological stress than women of other races. Stress is a leading factor in the start of labor, and therefore, high levels of stress during pregnancy could lead to premature births that have the potential to be fatal for the infant.

==== Early childhood trauma ====
Early childhood trauma includes physical, sexual, and psychological abuse of a child from birth to five years old. Trauma in early childhood has an extreme impact over the course of a lifetime and is a significant contributor to infant mortality. Developing organs are fragile, when an infant is shaken, beaten, strangled, or raped, the impact is exponentially more destructive than when the same abuse occurs to a fully developed body. Studies estimate that 1–2 per 100,000 U.S. children are fatally injured annually, and it is reasonable to assume that these statistics underrepresent actual mortality. Almost three-quarters (70.6%) of child fatalities in FFY 2018 involved children younger than 3 years, and children younger than 1 year accounted for half (49.4%) of all fatalities. In particular, correctly identifying deaths due to neglect is problematic, and children with sudden, unexpected deaths or deaths from apparently unintentional causes often have preventable risk factors that are substantially similar to those in families with maltreatment.

There is a direct relationship between the age at which maltreatment or injury occurs and the risk of death. The younger an infant is, the more dangerous the maltreatment.

Family configuration, child gender, social isolation, lack of support, maternal youth, marital status, poverty, parental adverse childhood experiences, and parenting practices are all thought to contribute to increased risk.

==== Socio-economic factors ====
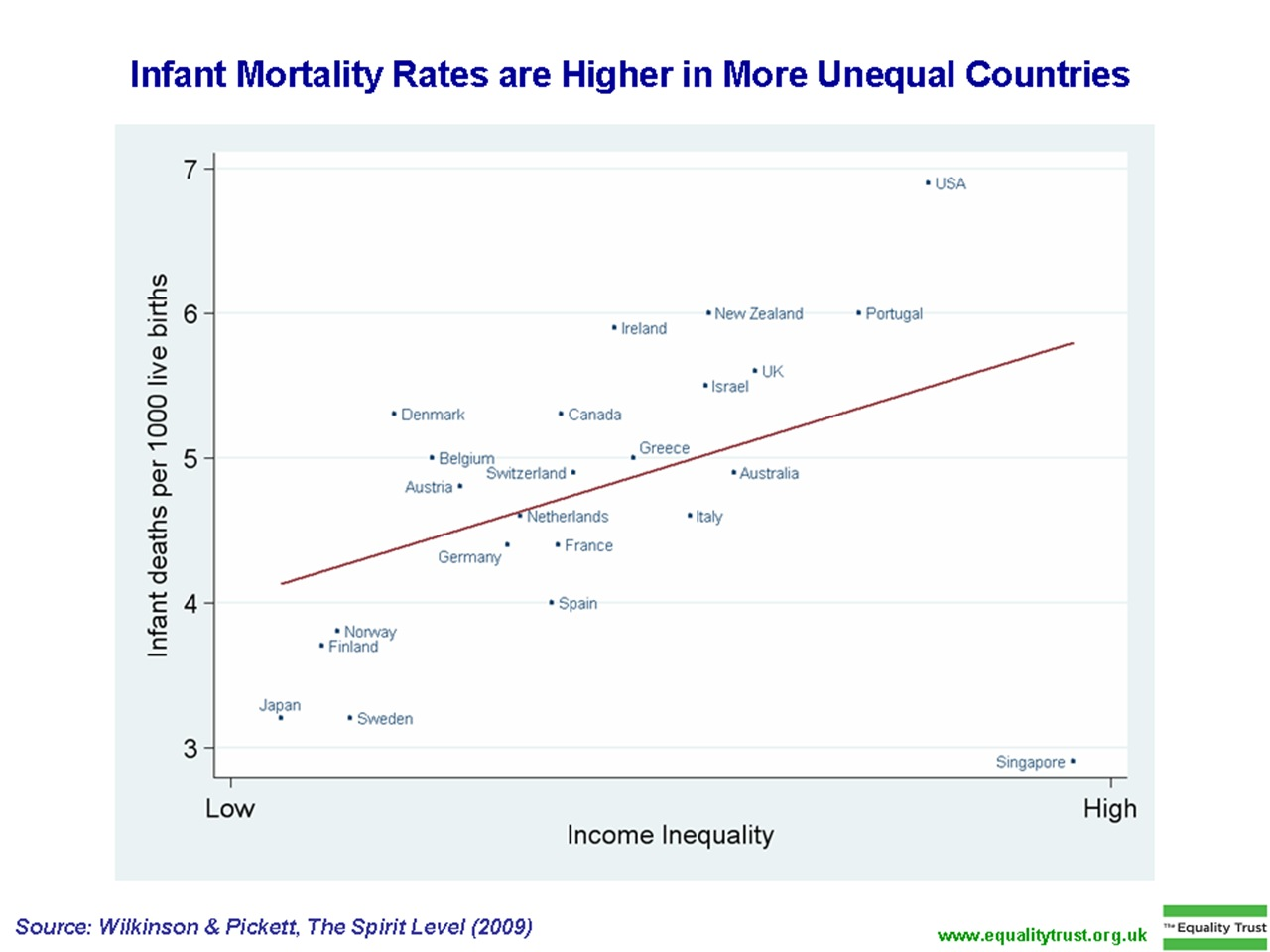
Infant mortality rates are higher in countries with higher economic inequality.

Social class is a major factor in infant mortality, both historically and today. Between 1912 and 1915, the Children's Bureau in the United States examined data across eight cities and nearly 23,000 live births. They discovered that lower incomes tended to correlate with higher infant mortality. In cases where the father had no income, the rate of infant mortality was 357% higher than that for the highest income earners ($1,250+). Differences between races were also apparent. African-American mothers experience infant mortality at a rate 44% higher than average; however, research indicates that socio-economic factors do not totally account for the racial disparities in infant mortality.

Countries or territories by GDP (PPP) per capita in 2025: >$70,000 $60,000 – $70,000 $50,000 – $60,000 $40,000 – $50,000 $30,000 – $40,000 $20,000 – $30,000 / $10,000 – $20,000 $5,000 – $10,000 $2,500 – $5,000 $1,000 – $2,500 <$1,000 No data

While infant mortality is normally negatively correlated with GDP, there may be some beneficial short-term effects from a recession. A 2009 study in The Economist showed that economic slowdowns reduce air pollution, which results in a lower infant mortality rate. In the late 1970s and early 1980s, the recession's impact on air quality was estimated to have saved around 1,300 US babies. It is only during deep recessions that infant mortality increases. According to Norbert Schady and Marc-François Smitz, recessions when per capita GDP drops by 15% or more increase IMR.

Social class dictates which medical services are available to an individual. Disparities due to socioeconomic factors have been highlighted by advances in medical technology. Developed countries, most notably the United States, have seen a divergence in IMR between those living in poverty who cannot afford medically advanced resources, and those who can.

Developing nations with democratic governments tend to be more responsive to public opinion, social movements, and special interest groups on issues like infant mortality. In contrast, non-democratic governments are more interested in corporate issues than in health issues. Democratic status affects the dependency a nation has on its economic state via exports, investments from multinational corporations, and international lending institutions.

Levels of socioeconomic development and global integration are inversely related to a nation's infant mortality rate, meaning that as they increase, IMR decreases. A nation's internal impact is highly influenced by its position in the global economy, which has adverse effects on the survival of children in developing countries. Countries can experience disproportionate effects from trade and stratification within the global system, which contributes to the global division of labor, and distorts the domestic economies of developing nations. The dependency of developing nations can reduce the rate of economic growth, increase income inequality inter- and intra-nationally, and adversely affect the wellbeing of a nation's population. Collective cooperation between countries plays a role in development policies in the poorer countries of the world.

These economic factors present challenges to governments' public health policies. If the nation's ability to raise its own revenues is compromised, governments will lose funding for their health service programs, including those that aim to decrease infant mortality rates. Less developed countries face higher levels of vulnerability to the possible negative effects of globalization and trade in relation to more developed countries.

Even with a strong economy and economic growth (measured by a country's gross national product), the advances of medical technologies may not be felt by everyone, increasing social disparities. In England, from 2014 to 2017, a rise in infant mortality was disproportionately experienced by the poorest regions, where the previously declining trend was reversed and an additional 24 infant deaths per 100,000 live births occurred annually.

==== War ====
Infant mortality rates correlate with war, political unrest, and government corruption. In most cases, war-affected areas will experience a significant increase in infant mortality rates. Having a war take place when planning pregnancy is not only stressful on the mother and fetus but also has several detrimental effects.

Many other significant factors influence infant mortality rates in war-torn areas. Health care systems in developing countries in the midst of war often collapse, and obtaining basic medical supplies and care becomes increasingly difficult. During the Yugoslav Wars in the 1990s, Bosnia experienced a 60% decrease in child immunizations. Preventable diseases can quickly become epidemics during war.

Many developing countries rely on foreign aid for basic nutrition, and transport of aid becomes significantly more difficult in times of war. In most situations, the average weight of a population will drop substantially. Expectant mothers are affected even more by a lack of access to food and water. During the Yugoslav Wars in Bosnia, the number of premature babies born increased and the average birth weight decreased.

There have been several instances in recent years of systematic rape as a weapon of war. People who become pregnant as a result of war rape face even more significant challenges in bearing a healthy child. Studies suggest that people who experience sexual violence before or during pregnancy are more likely to experience infant death. Causes of infant mortality after abuse during pregnancy range from physical side effects of the initial trauma to psychological effects that lead to poor adjustment to society. Many people who became pregnant by rape in Bosnia were isolated from their hometowns, making life after childbirth exponentially more difficult.

=== Culture ===
High rates of infant mortality occur in developing countries where financial and material resources are scarce, and where there is a high tolerance for infant deaths. There are a number of developing countries where certain cultural situations, such as favoring male babies over female babies, are the norm. In developing countries such as Brazil, infant mortality rates are commonly not recorded due to not registering for death certificates. Another cultural reason for infant mortality, such as what is happening in Ghana, is that "besides the obvious, like rutted roads, there are prejudices against wives or newborns leaving the house." This makes it even more difficult for pregnant women and newborns to get the needed treatment that is available to them.

In the United States cultural influences and lifestyle habits can account for some infant deaths. Examples include teenage pregnancy, obesity, diabetes, and smoking. All are possible causes of premature births, which constitute the second-highest cause of infant mortality. According to the Journal of the American Medical Association, "the post neonatal mortality risk (28 to 364 days) was highest among continental Puerto Ricans" compared to non-Hispanic babies. Ethnic differences are accompanied by a higher prevalence of behavioral risk factors and sociodemographic challenges that each ethnic group faces.

==== Male sex favoritism ====
Historically, males have had higher infant mortality rates than females, with the difference being dependent on environmental, social, and economic conditions. More specifically, males are biologically more vulnerable to infections and conditions associated with prematurity and development. Before 1970, the reasons for male infant mortality were infections and chronic degenerative diseases. However, since 1970, male sex favoritism in certain cultures has led to a decrease in the infant mortality gap between males and females. Also, medical advances have resulted in a greater effect on the survival rate of male infants than female infants, due to the initial high infant mortality rate of males.

Genetic components result in newborn females being at a biological advantage when it comes to surviving their first birthday, versus newborn males, who have lower chances of surviving infancy. As infant mortality rates decreased globally, the gender ratios changed from males being at a biological disadvantage to females facing a societal disadvantage. Some developing nations have social and cultural patterns that favor boys over girls for their future earning potential. A country's ethnic composition, homogeneous or heterogeneous, has been suggested by Fuse and Crenshaw to partly explain social attitudes and practices. According to their ecological study, heterogeneous levels may be protective against male-biased sex discrimination in terms of infant mortality.

==== Birth spacing ====
Map of countries by total fertility rate (2022–2023), referring to the average number of children that are born to a woman over her lifetime, according to the Population Reference Bureau.

Birth spacing is the time between births. Births spaced at least three years apart are associated with the lowest rate of mortality. The longer the interval between births, the lower the risk of having complications at birth, or of infant, childhood, or maternal mortality. Conception less than six months after a birth, abortion, or miscarriage is associated with higher rates of preterm births and low birth weight, and also increases the chances of chronic and general undernutrition. In 55 developing countries 57% of reported pregnancies had birth spaces of less than three years, and 26% of less than two years. While only 20% of new parents report wanting another birth within two years, only 40% are taking steps like family planning to achieve this.

Unplanned pregnancies and birth intervals of less than twenty-four months are known to correlate with low birth weights and delivery complications. Also, mothers who are already small in stature tend to deliver smaller than average babies, perpetuating a cycle of being underweight.

== Prevention and outcomes ==
To reduce infant mortality rates across the world, health practitioners, governments, and non-governmental organizations have worked to create institutions, programs, and policies to generate better health outcomes. Current efforts focus on the development of human resources, strengthening health information systems, health service delivery, etc. Improvements in such areas aim to increase regional health systems and aid efforts to reduce mortality rates.

=== Policy ===
Reductions in infant mortality are possible at any stage of a country's development. Rate reductions are evidence that a country is advancing in human knowledge, social institutions, and physical capital. Governments can reduce mortality rates by addressing the combined need for education (such as universal primary education), nutrition, and access to basic maternal and infant health services. Focused policies has the potential to aid those most at risk for infant and childhood mortality, including rural, poor, and migrant populations.

Reducing the chances of babies being born at low birth weights and contracting pneumonia can be accomplished by improving air quality. Improving hygiene can prevent infant mortality. Home-based technology to chlorinate, filter, and use solar disinfection for organic water pollution could reduce cases of diarrhea in children by up to 48%. Improvements in food supplies and sanitation have been shown to work for the most vulnerable populations in the US, including among African Americans.

Promoting behavioral changes, such as hand washing with soap, can significantly reduce the rate of infant mortality from respiratory and diarrheal diseases. According to UNICEF, hand washing with soap before eating and after using the toilet can save children's lives by reducing deaths from diarrhea and acute respiratory infections.

Focusing on preventing preterm and low birth weight deliveries throughout all populations can help eliminate cases of infant mortality and decrease health care disparities within communities. In the United States, these two goals have decreased regional infant mortality rates, but there has yet to be further progress on a national level.

Increasing human resources such as physicians, nurses, and other health professionals will increase the number of skilled attendants and the number of people able to give out immunizations against diseases such as measles. Increasing the number of skilled professionals is correlated with lower maternal, infant, and childhood mortality. With the addition of one physician per 10,000 people, there is a potential for 7.08 fewer infant deaths per 10,000.

In certain parts of the US, specific programs aim to reduce levels of infant mortality. One such program is the "Best Babies Zone" (BBZ), based at the University of California, Berkeley. The BBZ uses the life course approach to address the structural causes of poor birth outcomes and toxic stress in three US neighborhoods. By employing community-generated solutions, the Best Babies Zone's ultimate goal is to achieve health equity in communities that are disproportionately impacted by infant mortality.

=== Prenatal care and maternal health ===
Certain steps can help to reduce the chance of complications during pregnancy. Attending regular prenatal care check-ups will help improve the baby's chances of being delivered in safer conditions and surviving. Additionally, taking supplementation, including folic acid, can help reduce the chances of birth defects, a leading cause of infant mortality. Many countries have instituted mandatory folic acid supplementation in their food supply, which has significantly reduced the occurrence of a birth defect known as spina bifida in newborns. Similarly, the fortification of salt with iodine, called salt iodization, has helped reduce negative birth outcomes associated with low iodine levels during pregnancy.

Abstinence from alcohol can also decrease the chances of harm to the fetus as drinking any amount of alcohol during pregnancy may lead to fetal alcohol spectrum disorders (FASD) or other alcohol related birth defects. Tobacco use during pregnancy has also been shown to significantly increase the risk of a preterm or low birth weight birth, both of which are leading causes of infant mortality. Pregnant women should consult with their doctors to best manage any pre-existing health conditions to avoid complications to both their health as well as the fetus's. Obese people are at an increased risk of developing complications during pregnancy, including gestational diabetes or pre-eclampsia. Additionally, they are more likely to experience a pre-term birth or have a child with birth defects.

=== Nutrition ===
Appropriate nutrition for newborns and infants can help keep them healthy, and can help avoid health complications during early childhood. The American Academy of Pediatrics recommends exclusively breastfeeding infants for the first 6 months of life, and continuing breastfeeding as other sources of food are introduced through the next 6 months of life (up to 1 year of age). Infants under 6 months of age who are exclusively breastfed have a lower risk of mortality compared to infants who are breastfed part of the time or not at all. For this reason, breast feeding is favored over formula feeding by healthcare professionals.

=== Vaccinations ===
The Centers for Disease Control and Prevention (CDC) defines infants as those 1 month of age to 1 year of age. For these infants, the CDC recommends the following vaccinations: hepatitis B (HepB), rotavirus (RV), haemophilus influenzae type B (HIB), pneumococcal conjugate (PCV13), inactivated poliovirus (IPV < 18 yrs), influenza, varicella, measles, mumps, rubella (MMR), and diphtheria, tetanus, acellular pertussis (DTapP < 7yrs). Each of these vaccinations are given at particular age ranges depending on the vaccination and are required to be done in a series of 1 to 3 doses over time depending on the vaccination.

The efficacy of these vaccinations can be seen immediately following their introduction to society. Following the advent of the pneumococcal conjugate vaccine (PCV13) in the United States in the year 2000, the World Health Organization (WHO) reports studies done in 2004 had shown a 57% decline in invasive (Note: Invasive meaning cultured from a normally sterile site) penicillin resistant strains of the disease and a 59% reduction in multi drug resistant strains. This reduction was even greater for children under 2 years of age with studies finding an 81% reduction in those same strains.

As mentioned in a previous section, (Note: Causes: SIDS) sudden infant death syndrome (SIDS) is the leading cause of infant mortality between 1 month and 1 year of age. Immunizations, when given in accordance to proper guidelines, have shown to reduce the risk of SIDS by 50%. For this reason, the American Academy of Pediatrics (AAP) and the Center for Disease Control (CDC) both recommend immunizations in accordance to their guidelines.

=== Socio-economic factors ===
It has been well documented that increased education among mothers, communities, and local health workers results in better family planning, improvement in children's health, and lower rates of children's deaths. High-risk areas, such as Sub-Saharan Africa, have demonstrated that an increase in women's educational attainment leads to a reduction in infant mortality by about 35%. Similarly, coordinated efforts to train community health workers in diagnosis, treatment, malnutrition prevention, reporting and referral services has reduced infant mortality in children under 5 by as much as 38%. Public health campaigns centered around the First 1000 days of life have been successful in providing cost-effective supplemental nutrition programs, as well as assisting young mothers in sanitation, hygiene and breastfeeding. Increased intake of nutrients and better sanitation habits have a positive impact on health, especially for developing children. Educational attainment and public health campaigns provide the knowledge and means to practice better habits and lead to lower infant mortality rates.

A decrease in GDP results in increased rates of infant mortality. A reduction in household income reduces the amount being spent on food and healthcare, affecting the quality of life, and reduces access to medical services that ensure full development and survival. Likewise, increased household income translates to more access to nutrients and healthcare, reducing the risks associated with malnutrition and infant mortality. Moreover, increased aggregate household incomes will produce better health facilities, water and sewer infrastructures for the entire community.

== Differences in measurement ==
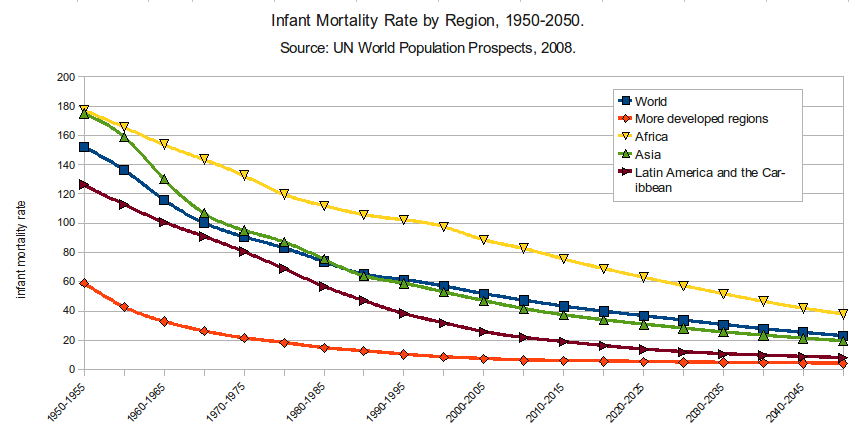
Infant mortality rate by region

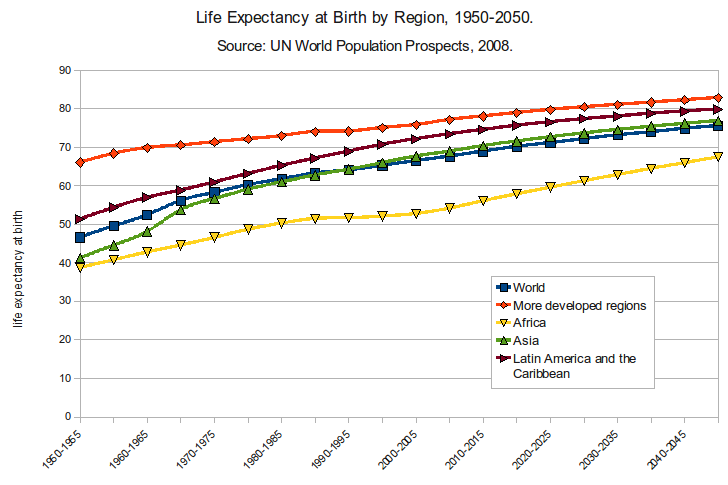
Life expectancy at birth by region

The infant mortality rate correlates very strongly with the likelihood of state failure, and is among the best predictors thereof. IMR is therefore also a useful indicator of a country's level of health (development), and is a component of the physical quality of life index.

The method of calculating IMR often varies widely between countries, as it is based on how they define a live birth and how many premature infants are born in the country. Depending on a nation's live birth criterion, vital registration system, and reporting practices, reporting may be inconsistent or understated. The reported IMR provides one statistic which reflects the standard of living in each nation. Changes in the infant mortality rate "reflect enduring social and technical capacities that become attached to a population". The World Health Organization (WHO) defines a live birth as any infant born demonstrating independent signs of life, including breathing, heartbeat, umbilical cord pulsation or definite movement of voluntary muscles. This definition is used in Austria, and is also used in Germany, but with one slight modification: muscle movement is not considered to be a sign of life. Many countries, including certain European states (e.g. France) and Japan, only count cases where an infant breathes at birth as a live birth, which makes their reported IMR numbers somewhat lower and increases their rates of perinatal mortality. In other countries, the Czech Republic and Bulgaria, for instance, requirements for live birth are even higher.

Although many countries have vital registration systems and specific reporting practices, there are often inaccuracies in the statistics, particularly in rural communities in developing countries. In those communities, some other alternative methods for calculating infant mortality rate are used, for example, popular death reporting and household survey. Studies have shown that when comparing three information sources—official registries, household surveys, and popular reporters—the popular death reporters are the most accurate; popular death reporters include midwives, gravediggers, coffin builders, priests, and others, essentially people who knew the most about the child's death. In developing nations, access to vital registries, and other government-run systems which record births and deaths, is difficult for poor families for several reasons. These struggles force families to take drastic measures, like having unofficial death ceremonies for their deceased infants. As a result, government statistics will inaccurately reflect a nation's infant mortality rate. Popular death reporters have first-hand information, and, provided this information can be collected and collated, can provide reliable, accurate death counts for a nation, as well as meaningful causes of deaths that can be measured and studied.

UNICEF uses a statistical methodology to account for reporting differences among countries:

UNICEF compiles infant mortality country estimates derived from all sources and methods of estimation obtained either from standard reports, direct estimation from micro data sets, or from UNICEF's yearly exercise. In order to sort out differences between estimates produced from different sources, with different methods, UNICEF developed, in coordination with WHO, the WB and UNSD, an estimation methodology that minimizes the errors embodied in each estimate and harmonize trends along time. Since the estimates are not necessarily the exact values used as input for the model, they are often not recognized as the official IMR estimates used at the country level. However, as mentioned before, these estimates minimize errors and maximize the consistency of trends along time.

Another challenge in comparing infant mortality rates is the practice of counting frail or premature infants who die before the normal due date as miscarriages, or counting those who die during or immediately after childbirth as stillbirths. Therefore, the quality of a country's documentation of perinatal mortality can greatly affect the accuracy of its infant mortality statistics. This point is reinforced by the demographer Ansley Coale, who finds the high ratios of reported stillbirths to infant deaths in Hong Kong and Japan in the first 24 hours after birth dubious. As this pattern is consistent with the high male to female sex ratios recorded at birth in those countries it suggests two things: that many female infants who die in the first 24 hours are misreported as stillbirths rather than infant deaths; and that those countries do not follow WHO recommendations for the reporting of live births versus infant deaths.

Another seemingly paradoxical finding is that when countries with poor medical services introduce new medical centers and services, instead of declining, the reported IMRs often increase for a time. This is mainly because improvement in access to medical care is often accompanied by improvement in the registration of births and deaths. Deaths that might have occurred in a remote or rural area, and not been reported to the government, might now be reported by the new medical personnel or facilities. Thus, even if the new health services reduce the actual IMR, the reported IMR may increase.

The country-to-country variation in child mortality rates is huge, and growing wider despite progress in decreasing the overall IMR. Among the world's roughly 200 nations, only Somalia showed no decrease in the under-5 mortality rate over the past two decades. In 2011 the global rate of under-5 deaths was 51 deaths per 1,000 births. Singapore had the lowest rate at 2.6, while Sierra Leone had the highest at 185 child deaths per 1,000 births. In the U.S., the rate was 8 under-5 deaths per 1,000 births.

Infant mortality rate (IMR) is not only a statistic but also a reflection of socioeconomic development, as such it effectively represents the presence of medical services in a country. IMR is an effective resource for health departments making decisions on medical resource allocation, and also formulates global health strategies and helps evaluate their success. The use of IMR helps solve the inadequacies of other vital statistic systems for global health as most neglect infant mortality rates among the poor. There remains a certain amount of unrecorded infant death in rural area as they either do not have the concept of reporting early infant death, or they do not know about the importance of the IMR.

=== Europe and US ===
Requirements for reporting a live birth, United States and selected European countries, 2004
Reporting requirement	Country
All live births	Austria, Denmark, England and Wales, Finland, Germany, Hungary, Italy, Northern Ireland, Portugal, Scotland, Slovak Republic, Spain, Sweden, United States
Live births at 12 weeks of gestation or more	Norway
Live births at 500 grams birthweight or more, and less than 500 grams if the infant survives for 24 hours	Czech Republic
Live births at 22 weeks of gestation or more, or 500 grams birthweight or more	France
All live births for civil registration, births at 500 grams birthweight or more for the national perinatal register	Ireland
Live births at 22 weeks of gestation or more, 500 grams birthweight or more if gestational age is unknown	Netherlands
Live births at 500 or more grams birthweight	Poland

The inclusion or exclusion of high-risk neonates from the reported IMRs can cause problems in making comparisons. Many countries, including the United States, Sweden and Germany, count any birth exhibiting any sign of life as alive, no matter the month of gestation or neonatal size. All of the countries named in the table adopted the WHO definitions in the late 1980s or early 1990s, and they are used throughout the European Union. However, in 2009, the US CDC issued a report that stated that the American rates of infant mortality were affected by the high rates of premature babies in the United States compared to European countries. It also outlined the differences in reporting requirements between the United States and Europe, noting that France, the Czech Republic, Ireland, the Netherlands, and Poland do not report all live births under 500 g and/or 22 weeks of gestation. However, differences in reporting are unlikely to be the primary explanation for the high rate of infant mortality in the United States compared to countries at a similar level of economic development. Rather, the report concluded that the primary reason for the higher infant mortality rate in the US compared to Europe was the much higher number of preterm births.

Until the 1990s, Russia and the Soviet Union did not count, either as a live birth or as an infant death, extremely premature infants that were born alive but failed to survive for at least seven days (infants born weighing less than 1,000 g, of less than 28 weeks gestational age, or less than 35 cm in length, who that breathed, had a heartbeat, or exhibited voluntary muscle movement). Although such extremely premature infants typically accounted for only about 0.5% of all live-born children, their exclusion led to an estimated 22%–25% lower reported IMR. (Note: In 1990, the Baltic states moved to the WHO standard definition; in 1993 Russia also moved to this definition.) In some cases, too, perhaps because hospitals or regional health departments were held accountable for lowering the IMR in their catchment area, infant deaths that occurred in the 12th month were "transferred" statistically to the 13th month (i.e., the second year of life), and thus no longer classified as an infant death.

=== Brazil ===
In certain rural developing areas, such as northeastern Brazil, infant births are often not recorded, resulting in the discrepancies between the infant mortality rate (IMR) and the actual number of infant deaths. Access to vital registry systems for infant births and deaths is an extremely difficult and expensive task for poor parents living in rural areas. Government and bureaucracies tend to show an insensitivity to these parents and produce broad disclaimers in the IMR reports that the information has not been properly reported, resulting in discrepancies. Little has been done to address the underlying structural problems with the vital registry systems regarding the lack of reporting in rural areas, which has created a gap between the official and popular meanings of child death.

It is also argued that the bureaucratic separation of vital death recording from cultural death rituals is to blame for the inaccuracy of the infant mortality rate (IMR). Vital death registries often fail to recognize the cultural implications and importance of infant deaths. These systems can be an accurate representation of a region's socio-economic situation, if the statistics are valid, which is unfortunately not always the case. An alternate method of collecting and processing statistics on infant and child mortality is via "popular death reporters" who are culturally linked to infants and may be able to provide more accurate statistics. According to ethnographic data, "popular death reporters" refers to people who had inside knowledge of anjinhos, including the grave-digger, gatekeeper, midwife, popular healers etc.—all key participants in mortuary rituals. Combining the methods of household surveys, vital registries, and asking "popular death reporters" can increase the validity of child mortality rates. However, there remain barriers that affect the validity of statistics of infant mortality, including political economic decisions: numbers are exaggerated when international funds are being doled out; and underestimated during reelection.

The bureaucratic separation of vital death reporting and cultural death rituals stems, in part, from structural violence. Individuals living in rural areas of Brazil need funds for lodging and travel in order to report births to a Brazilian Assistance League office, this deters registration as often these individuals are of lower income and cannot afford such expenses, similar barriers exist when choosing to report infant mortality. Financial constraints such as reliance on food supplementations may also lead to skewed infant mortality data.

In developing countries such as Brazil the deaths of impoverished infants are regularly not recorded into the countries vital registration system, which skews statistics. Culturally validity and contextual soundness can be used to ground the meaning of mortality from a statistical standpoint. In northeast Brazil they have accomplished this standpoint while conducting an ethnographic study combined with an alternative method to survey infant mortality. These types of techniques can develop quality data that will lead to a better portrayal of the IMR of a region.

Political economic reasons have been seen to skew the infant mortality data in the past when governor Ceara devised his presidency campaign on reducing the infant mortality rate during his term in office. By using this new way of surveying, these instances can be minimized and removed, overall creating accurate and sound data.

== Epidemiology ==
World historical and predicted infant mortality rates per 1,000 births (1950–2050) UN, medium variant, 2008 rev.
Years	Rate	Years	Rate
1950–1955	152	2000–2005	52
1955–1960	136	2005–2010	47
1960–1965	116	2010–2015	43
1965–1970	100	2015–2020	40
1970–1975	91	2020–2025	37
1975–1980	83	2025–2030	34
1980–1985	74	2030–2035	31
1985–1990	65	2035–2040	28
1990–1995	61	2040–2045	25
1995–2000	57	2045–2050	23

Global IMR, as well as the IMR for both less developed countries (LDCs) and more developed countries (MDCs), declined significantly between 1960 and 2001. According to the State of the World's Mothers report by Save the Children, the world IMR declined from 126 in 1960 to 57 in 2001. The global neonatal mortality rate, NMR, decreased from 36.6 in 1990 to 18.0 in 2017.

However, IMR was, and remains, higher in LDCs. In 2001, the IMR for 91 LDCs was about 10 times as large as it was for 8 MDCs. On average, for LDCs, the IMR is 17 times higher than that of MDCs. Also, while both LDCs and MDCs made significant reductions in IMR, the reduction rate has been lower in less developed countries than among the more developed countries. Among many low- and middle-income countries, there is also substantial variation in infant mortality rate at a subnational level.

As the lowest rate, in Monaco, is 1.80, and the highest IMR, in Afghanistan, is 121.63, a factor of about 67 separates them.

Top and bottom five countries by this measure (2013 estimates)
Rank	Country	Infant mortality rate (deaths/1,000 live births)
1	Afghanistan	121.63
2	Niger	109.98
3	Mali	109.08
4	Somalia	103.72
5	Central African Republic	97.17
218	Sweden	2.74
219	Singapore	2.65
220	Bermuda	2.47
221	Japan	2.21
222	Monaco	1.80

=== United Kingdom ===
A study published in the British Medical Journal in 2019 found that the rate of infant mortality in England had increased with an additional 24 infant deaths per 100,000 live births per year. There was no significant change from the pre-existing trend in the most affluent areas, thus the rise disproportionately affected the poorest areas of the country, and was attributed largely to rising child poverty, as a result of sustained reductions in the welfare benefits available to families with children.

=== United States ===
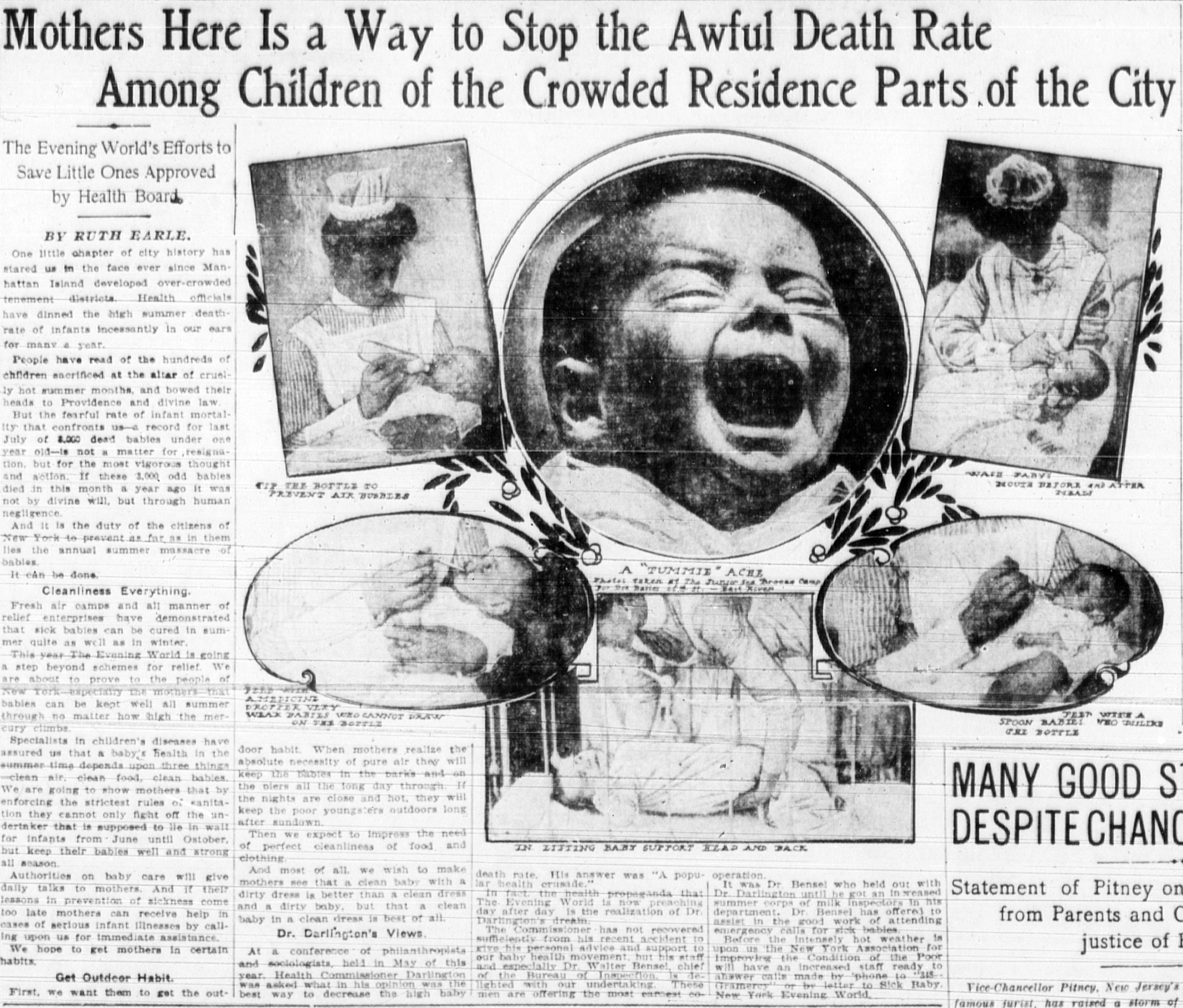
1906 headline imploring parents to attend to the cleanliness of their infants, and to expose them to the "clean air" outdoors

According to the CIA World Factbook, which ranks 227 entities—including sovereign nations, dependent territories, and other recognized regions—the United States ranks 173rd in infant mortality, with a rate of 5.1 deaths per 1,000 live births as of 2024. In 2013, the leading cause of infant mortality in the United States was birth defects. Significant racial and socio-economic differences in the United States affect the IMR, in contrast with other developed countries with more homogeneous populations. In particular, IMR varies greatly by race in the US. The average IMR for the country as a whole is therefore not a fair representation of the wide variations that exist between segments of the population. Many theories have been explored as to why these racial differences exist, with socio economic factors usually coming out as a reasonable explanation. However, more studies have been conducted around this matter, and the largest advancement is around the idea of stress and how it affects pregnancy.

In the 1850s, the infant mortality rate in the United States was estimated at 216.8 per 1,000 white babies and 340.0 per 1,000 African American babies, but rates have significantly declined in modern times. This declining rate has been mainly due to modern improvements in basic health care and technology, as well as medical advances. In the last century, the infant mortality rate has decreased by 93%. Overall, the rates per 1,000 births have decreased drastically from 20 deaths in 1970 to 6.9 deaths in 2003. In 2003, the leading causes of infant mortality in the United States were congenital anomalies, disorders related to immaturity, AIDS, and maternal complications. Smoking during pregnancy declined to 10.2% with 12.4% of these births being low birth weights, compared with 7.7% of births being low birth weights for non-smokers. Overall, babies born with low birth weight increased to 8.1% between 2003 and 2004. According to the New York Times, "the main reason for the high rate is preterm delivery, and there was a 10% increase in such births from 2000 to 2006." Between 2007 and 2011, however, the preterm birth rate has decreased every year. In 2011, 11.73% of babies were born before the 37th week of gestation, down from a high of 12.80% in 2006.

Economic expenditures on labor and delivery and neonatal care are relatively high in the United States. A conventional birth averages US$9,775 with a C-section costing US$15,041. Preterm births in the US have been estimated to cost $51,600 per child, with a total yearly cost of $26.2 billion. Despite this spending, several reports state that infant mortality rate in the United States is significantly higher than in other developed nations. Estimates vary; the CIA's World Factbook ranks the US 55th internationally in 2014, with a rate of 6.17, while the UN figures from 2005 to 2010 place the US 34th.

Differences in measurement could play a substantial role in the disparity between the US and other nations. A non-viable birth in the US could be registered as a stillbirth in similarly developed nations like Japan, Sweden, Norway, Ireland, the Netherlands, and France, thereby reducing their IMR. Neonatal intensive care is also more likely to be applied in the US to marginally viable infants, although such interventions have been found to increase both costs and disability. A study following the implementation of the Born Alive Infant Protection Act of 2002 found universal resuscitation of infants born between 20 and 23 weeks increased the neonatal spending burden by $313.3 million while simultaneously decreasing quality-adjusted life years by 329.3.

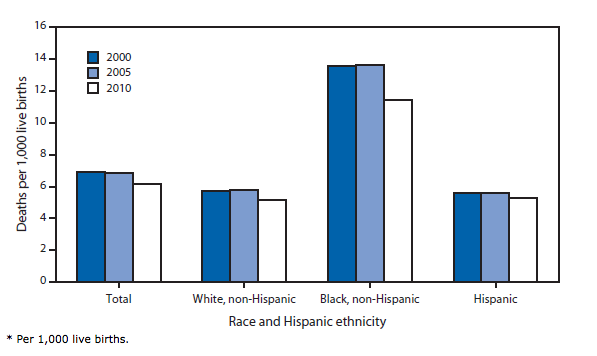
Data indicating the IMR disparity between infants non-Hispanic black postpartum parent's and infants of white or Hispanic postpartum parents in the United States from 2000 to 2010

The vast majority of research conducted in the late twentieth and early twenty-first century indicates that African-American infants are more than twice as likely to die in their first year of life than white infants. Although a decline occurred from 13.63 deaths in 2005 to 11.46 deaths per 1,000 live births in 2010, non-Hispanic black parents continued to report a rate 2.2 times as high as that for non-Hispanic white parents.

Contemporary research findings have demonstrated that nationwide racial disparities in infant mortality are linked to the experiences of the postpartum parent and that these disparities cannot be totally accounted for by socio-economic, behavioral or genetic factors. The Hispanic paradox, an effect observed in other health indicators, appears in the infant mortality rate, as well. Hispanic postpartum parents see an IMR comparable to non-Hispanic white postpartum parents, even with lower educational attainment and economic status. According to Mustillo's CARDIA (Coronary Artery Risk Development in Young Adults) study, "self reported experiences of racial discrimination were associated with pre-term and low-birthweight deliveries, and such experiences may contribute to black-white disparities in prenatal outcomes." A study in North Carolina, for example, concluded that "white women who did not complete high school have a lower infant mortality rate than black college graduates." Likewise, dozens of population-based studies indicate that "the subjective, or perceived experience of racial discrimination is strongly associated with an increased risk of infant death and with poor health prospects for future generations of African Americans."

==== African American ====
Non-Hispanic Black women have the highest infant mortality rate with a rate of 11.3, while the IMR among white women is 5.1. A popular theory is that due to the trend of black women being of a lower socio-economic status, there is in an increased likelihood of a child suffering; but while a correlation exists, the theory is not congruent with the data on Latino IMR in the United States. Latino people are almost as likely to experience poverty as blacks in the U.S., but the infant mortality rate of Latinos is much closer to white women than it is to black women. The poverty rate for blacks is 24.1% and for Latinos it is 21.4%; if there is a direct correlation, then the IMR of these two groups should be similar, but blacks have an IMR double that of Latinos. For black women who move out of poverty, or never experienced it in the first place, their IMR is not much lower than their counterparts experiencing higher levels of poverty.

Tyan Parker Dominguez at the University of Southern California theorizes that the disproportionally high IMR among African American women is because they experience stress at much higher rates than any other group in the country. Stress produces particular hormones that can induce labor and contribute to other pregnancy problems. Considering premature birth is one of the leading causes of death of infants under the age of one, early labor is a legitimate concern. The idea of stress as a factor in IMR spans socio-economic status, as Parker Dominguez says that for lower-class women, stress comes from an unstable family life and chronic worry over poverty, while for middle-class women, battling racism, real or perceived, can be an extreme stressor.

While others believe all women from African descent are predisposed to a higher IMR, foreign-born African immigrants, coming from a completely different social context, are not prone to the higher IMR experienced by American-born black women. Arline Geronimus, a professor at the University of Michigan School of Public Health, calls the phenomenon "weathering". She claims constantly dealing with disadvantages and racial prejudice causes black women's birth outcomes to deteriorate with age. Therefore, younger black women may experience stress with pregnancy due to social and economic factors, but older women experience stress at a compounding rate and therefore have pregnancy complications aside from economic factors.

Mary O. Hearst, a professor in the Department of Public Health at Saint Catherine University, researched the effects of segregation on the African American community to see if it contributed to the high IMR in black children. Hearst claims that residential segregation contributes to the high rates because of the political, economic, and health implications it poses on black mothers regardless of their socioeconomic status. Racism, economic disparities, and sexism in segregated communities are all examples of the daily stressors that pregnant black women face, and are risk factors for conditions that can affect their pregnancies such as pre-eclampsia and hypertension.

Studies have also shown that high IMR is due to the inadequate care that pregnant African Americans receive compared to other women in the country. In another study, it was shown that Black patients were more likely to receive ibuprofen after surgery instead of oxycodone. This unequal treatment stems from the misconception of racial medical differences, as well as racial biases and controlled images of black women. Because of this, research on maternal and prenatal care received by African American women and their infants finds that black women do not receive the same urgency in medical care; they are also not taken as seriously regarding pain they feel or complications they think they are having, as exemplified by the complications tennis player Serena Williams faced during her delivery.

Several peer-reviewed articles have documented a difference in the levels of care a black patient receives regardless of whether they have insurance. For white women, IMR drops after age 20 and remains the same until she is in her 40s; for black women, IMR does not decrease when accounting for higher education, nor change based on age, suggesting that there is a racial element. Another element which is considered is the effect of the intersection of race and gender. Misogynoir is a commonly cited and overlooked issue. Black feminists argue that despite their role in civil rights movements, they are overlooked when it comes to meaningful change that positively changes the lives of Black women specifically. During the June 2020 Black Lives Matter protests, many black feminists criticized the movement for excluding them.

Some research argues that to end the high infant mortality rate of black children, the country needs to fix the social and societal issues that plague African Americans, such as institutional racism, mass incarceration, poverty, and health care disparities. If institutional inequalities are addressed and repaired by the United States Government, this will reduce daily stressors for African Americans, particularly women, and lessen the risk of complications in pregnancy and infant mortality. Others argue that increasing diversity in the health care industry can help reduce the IMR, as more representation can tackle deep-rooted racial biases and stereotypes that exist towards African American women. Another attempt to reduce high IMR among black children is the use of doulas throughout pregnancy.

== History ==
In the early 1900s, countries around the world started to notice that there was a need for better child health care services; first in Europe, and then with the United States creating a campaign to decrease the infant mortality rate. With this program, they were able to lower the IMR from 100 deaths to 10 deaths per every 1,000 births. When infant mortality began being noticed as a national problem it was viewed a social problem, and middle class American women with an educational background started to create a movement to provide housing for families of a lower social class. Through this movement they were able to establish public health care and government agencies, which in turn made more sanitary and healthier environments for infants. Medical professionals helped further the cause for infant health by creating the field of pediatrics, which is devoted to the medical care of children.

=== United States ===
In the 20th century decreases in infant mortality around the world were linked to several common trends, including social programs, improved sanitation, improved access to healthcare, and improved education, as well as scientific advancements like the discovery of penicillin and the development of safer blood transfusions. By improving sanitation, especially access to safe drinking water, the United States dramatically decreased infant mortality, which had been a growing concern in the United States since the 1850s. During this time the United States also endeavored to increase education and awareness regarding infant mortality. Pasteurization of milk also helped the United States combat infant mortality in the early 1900s, as it helped curb disease in infants. These factors, on top of a general increase in the standard of living in urban areas, helped the United States make dramatic improvements to their rates of infant mortality in the early 20th century.

Although the overall infant mortality rate was sharply dropping during this time, within the United States infant mortality varied greatly among racial and socio-economic groups. Between 1915 and 1933 the change in infant mortality per 1,000 births was, for the white population, 98.6 down to 52.8 per 1,000, and for the black population, 181.2 to 94.4 per 1,000 - studies imply that this has a direct correlation with relative economic conditions between these populations. Additionally, infant mortality in southern states was consistently 2% higher than other regions in the US across a 20-year period starting in 1985. Southern states also tend to perform worse on predictors for higher infant mortality, such as per capita income and poverty rate.

In the latter half of the 20th century, a focus on greater access to medical care for women spurred declines in infant mortality in the United States. The implementation of Medicaid, granting wider access to healthcare, contributed to a dramatic decrease in infant mortality, as did greater access to legal abortion and family-planning care, such the IUD and the birth control pill.

By 1984, the United States' decreasing infant mortality slowed. Funding for the federally subsidized Medicaid and Maternal and Infant Care programs was reduced, and availability of prenatal care decreased for low-income parents.

=== China ===
The growth of medical resources in the People's Republic of China's during the latter half of the 20th century partly explains its dramatic improvement regarding infant mortality during this time. The Rural Cooperative Medical System, which was founded in the 1950s, granted healthcare access to previously underserved rural populations, and is estimated to have covered 90% of China's rural population throughout the 1960s. The Cooperative Medical System achieved an infant mortality rate of 25.09 per 1,000; while it was later defunded, leaving many rural populations to rely on an expensive fee-for-service system, the rate continued to decline. As the Cooperative Medical System was replaced, the change caused a socio-economic gap in accessibility to medical care in China, however this was not reflected in its declining infant mortality rate; prenatal care was increasingly used, and delivery assistance remained accessible.

China's one-child policy, adopted in the 1980s, negatively impacted its infant mortality. Women carrying unapproved pregnancies faced state consequences and social stigma and were thus less likely to use prenatal care. Additionally, economic realities and long-held cultural factors incentivized male offspring, leading some families who already had sons to avoid prenatal care or professional delivery services, and causing China to have unusually high female infant mortality rates during this time.

== See also ==
- Maternal mortality
- Child mortality
- Adult mortality
- Miscarriage
- Stillbirth
- List of countries by infant mortality rate
- List of countries by maternal mortality ratio
  - History of public health in the United Kingdom

Related statistical categories:

- Perinatal mortality only includes deaths between the fetal viability (22 weeks gestation) and the end of the 7th day after delivery.
- Neonatal mortality only includes deaths in the first 28 days of life.
- Postneonatal mortality only includes deaths after 28 days of life but before one year.
- Child mortality includes deaths before the age of 5.
