= Social Science Genetic Association Consortium =

Consortium of genetics researchers in the social sciences

The Social Science Genetic Association Consortium, abbreviated SSGAC, is a consortium of scientists dedicated to studying the role of genetics in important life outcomes in the social sciences. It has received media coverage for its research looking for genetic variants associated with educational attainment. For instance, the Consortium's first study, published in 2013, found three such variants in a sample of 101,000 people.

The SSGAC was founded by Daniel Benjamin (University of Southern California), David Cesarini (New York University), and Philipp Koellinger (VU Amsterdam). According to Benjamin, "One major impetus for the formation of the SSGAC was the growing recognition that most effects of individual genetic markers on behavioral traits are very small and that, consequently, very large samples are required to accurately detect them". It was founded during a meeting of the Cohorts for Heart and Aging Research in Genomic Epidemiology (CHARGE) consortium on February 12, 2011. The SSGAC continues operates with support from CHARGE.
