= David Cesarini =

American economist

- David Alexander Cesarini

Academic background
- Education: Massachusetts Institute of Technology (Ph.D., 2010)
- Doctoral advisors: David Laibson; Drazen Prelec

Academic work
- Discipline: Behavioral economics Microeconomics
- Institutions: New York University

David Alexander Cesarini is an associate professor in the Department of Economics & Center for Experimental Social Science at New York University, a Faculty Research Fellow at the National Bureau of Economic Research, as well as affiliated researcher at the Research Institute for Industrial Economics (IFN). He is an empirically oriented economist with interests in social-science genetics, applied microeconomics and behavioral economics—especially known for his research in genoeconomics and the heritability of economic behaviors and attitudes, such as investing decisions and confidence.

His early work on genetics and social science applied methods from behavior genetics to various economic outcomes. These studies sought to infer the role of genetic factors by contrasting the resemblance of different kinships (usually twins—e.g., Cesarini et al. 2009). In recent years, his attention has gradually shifted towards applications with molecular genetic data. Much of his current research in social-science genetics is conducted under the auspices of the Social Science Genetic Association Consortium (SSGAC), a research infrastructure he co-founded to facilitate rigorous genetic association studies of behavioral and social-science outcomes—such as dietary intake, educational attainment, health behaviors, risk preferences and subjective well-being.

Outside of genetics, Cesarini works on a broad range of questions in applied microeconomics and behavioral economics. In collaboration with two IFN-affiliated researchers, Erik Lindqvist and Robert Östling, he helped instigate a research program on the causal impact of wealth on economic and behavioral outcomes. These studies all leverage the randomized assignment of lottery prizes in a large sample of Swedish lottery players who have been matched to government records with information about health, labor supply, crime, marriage, and fertility and a host of other variables. The large and rich data set is an unusually valuable resource for making credible inferences about the causal impact of wealth. To date, the data assembled by the research team have used to study health-care utilization, mortality and child development (Cesarini et al. 2016), labor supply (Cesarini et al. 2017), subjective health (Östling, Cesarini, and Lindqvist 2020), subjective well-being (Lindqvist, Östling, and Cesarini 2020) as well as stock market participation (Briggs et al. 2020).
