= Adult mortality =

Death of adult between 15 and 60 years old

Adult mortality is the death of an adult between the ages of 15 and 60 years. The adult mortality rate refers to the probability of dying between 15 and 60 years expressed per 1,000 population. Since adults are the most economically productive age span, adult mortality rate is an important indicator for the comprehensive assessment of mortality patterns in a population.

== See also ==
- Infant mortality
- Child mortality
