= Donald Lloyd-Jones =

American epidemiologist

Donald M. Lloyd-Jones is an American epidemiologist who is the director of the Framingham Center for Population and Prevention Science, principal investigator of the Framingham Heart Study, and chief of the section of preventive medicine within the department of medicine at the Chobanian & Avedisian School of Medicine and Boston Medical Center, since January 1, 2025.

He is the past Eileen M. Foell Professor at Northwestern University.

== Education ==
He earned his M.D. at Columbia University in 1991.

== Research ==
His interests are preventative medicine, cardiology and aging. His highest cited paper is "Heart disease and stroke statistics" at 6043 times, according to Google Scholar.

== Selected publications ==
- Neil J. Stone, Jennifer G. Robinson, Alice H. Lichtenstein, C. Noel Bairey Merz, Conrad B. Blum, Robert H. Eckel, Anne C. Goldberg, David Gordon, Daniel Levy, Donald M. Lloyd-Jones, Patrick McBride, J. Sanford Schwartz, Susan T. Shero, Sidney C. Smith Jr., Karol Watson and Peter W.F. Wilson (1 July 2014). "2013 ACC/AHA Guideline on the Treatment of Blood Cholesterol to Reduce Atherosclerotic Cardiovascular Risk in Adults: a report of the American College of Cardiology/American Heart Association Task Force on Practice Guidelines". Journal of the American College of Cardiology. 63 (25 Part B). American College of Cardiology: 2889–3734. doi:10.1016/j.jacc.2013.11.002. PMID 24239923.
- Véronique L. Roger, Alan S. Go, Donald M. Lloyd-Jones, Emelia J. Benjamin, Jarett D. Berry, William B. Borden, Dawn M. Bravata, Shifan Dai, Earl S. Ford, Caroline S. Fox, Heather J. Fullerton, Cathleen Gillespie, Susan M. Hailpern, John A. Heit, Virginia J. Howard, Brett M. Kissela, Steven J. Kittner, Daniel T. Lackland, Judith H. Lichtman, Lynda D. Lisabeth, Diane M. Makuc, Gregory M. Marcus, Ariane Marelli, David B. Matchar, Claudia S. Moy, Dariush Mozaffarian, Michael E. Mussolino, Graham Nichol, Nina P. Paynter, Elsayed Z. Soliman, Paul D. Sorlie, Nona Sotoodehnia, Tanya N. Turan, Salim S. Virani, Nathan D. Wong, Daniel Woo, Melanie B. Turner (3 January 2012). "Heart disease and stroke statistics—2012 update: a report from the American Heart Association". Circulation. 125 (1). American Heart Association: e2 – e220. doi:10.1161/CIR.0b013e31823ac046. PMC 4440543. PMID 22179539.
- Donald Lloyd-Jones, Robert Adams, Mercedes Carnethon, Giovanni De Simone, T. Bruce Ferguson, Katherine Flegal, Earl Ford, Karen Furie, Alan Go, Kurt Greenlund, Nancy Haase, Susan Hailpern, Michael Ho, Virginia Howard, Brett Kissela, Steven Kittner, Daniel Lackland, Lynda Lisabeth, Ariane Marelli, Mary McDermott, James Meigs, Dariush Mozaffarian, Graham Nichol, Christopher O'Donnell, Veronique Roger, Wayne Rosamond, Ralph Sacco, Paul Sorlie, Randall Stafford, Julia Steinberger, Thomas Thom, Sylvia Wasserthiel-Smoller, Nathan Wong, Judith Wylie-Rosett, Yuling Hong (27 January 2009). "Heart Disease and Stroke Statistics—2009 update: a report from the American Heart Association Statistics Committee and Stroke Statistics Subcommittee". Circulation. 119 (3). American Heart Association: e21 – e181. doi:10.1161/CIRCULATIONAHA.108.191259. PMID 19171871.
- Véronique L. Roger, Alan S. Go, Donald M. Lloyd-Jones, Robert J. Adams, Jarett D. Berry, Todd M. Brown, Mercedes R. Carnethon, Shifan Dai, Giovanni de Simone, Earl S. Ford, Caroline S. Fox, Heather J. Fullerton, Cathleen Gillespie, Kurt J. Greenlund, Susan M. Hailpern, John A. Heit, P. Michael Ho, Virginia J. Howard, Brett M. Kissela, Steven J. Kittner, Daniel T. Lackland, Judith H. Lichtman, Lynda D. Lisabeth, Diane M. Makuc, Gregory M. Marcus, Ariane Marelli, David B. Matchar, Mary M. McDermott, James B. Meigs, Claudia S. Moy, Dariush Mozaffarian, Michael E. Mussolino, Graham Nichol, Nina P. Paynter, Wayne D. Rosamond, Paul D. Sorlie, Randall S. Stafford, Tanya N. Turan, Melanie B. Turner, Nathan D. Wong, Judith Wylie-Rosett (1 February 2011). "Heart Disease and Stroke Statistics—2011 update: a report from the American Heart Association". Circulation. 123 (4). American Heart Association: e18 – e209. doi:10.1161/CIR.0b013e3182009701. PMC 4418670. PMID 21160056.
