= Cohorts for Heart and Aging Research in Genomic Epidemiology =

Genome-wide association study consortium

Cohorts for Heart and Aging Research in Genomic Epidemiology, abbreviated CHARGE, is a consortium formed to facilitate meta-analyses of genome-wide association studies of aging and cardiovascular traits, and the replication of genotype–phenotype associations identified in such studies. CHARGE was initially launched in 2008 as a voluntary collaboration between five prospective cohort studies: the Age, Gene/Environment Susceptibility-Reykjavik Study (AGES) in Iceland, the Atherosclerosis Risk in Communities Study, the Cardiovascular Health Study, and the Framingham Heart Study in the United States, and the Rotterdam Study in the Netherlands. Other cohort studies have joined the consortium since its founding, including the Multi-Ethnic Study of Atherosclerosis and the Coronary Artery Risk Development in Young Adults Study. The organization of the consortium consists of a Research Steering Committee, an Analysis Committee, a Genotyping Committee, and roughly 35 phenotype-specific working groups.
