= Mary M. McDermott =

Mary McDermott

Academic background
- Education: BA, 1985, Yale University; MD, 1989, Michigan State University

Academic work
- Institutions: Feinberg School of Medicine, JAMA

Mary McGrae McDermott is the Jeremiah Stamler Professor of Medicine in the Division of General Internal Medicine and Geriatrics and of Preventive Medicine at Northwestern University's Feinberg School of Medicine. Her studies focus on interventions for peripheral artery disease. She is a deputy editor at the Journal of the American Medical Association (JAMA), specializing in clinical reviews and education.

== Early life and education ==
McDermott earned her Bachelor of Arts degree from Yale University in 1985 and her medical degree from Michigan State University. She subsequently completed her medical residency at Northwestern's McGaw Medical Center in 1992.

== Research ==
McDermott joined the faculty at Northwestern University's Feinberg School of Medicine in 1994 and began investigating how to improve the health in people with peripheral extremity artery disease (PAD). She was the first principal investigator to demonstrate that "asymptomatic leg ischemia is associated with greater lower extremity impairment and increased rates of functional decline," compared to those without PAD. She has also identified clinical characteristics associated with faster rates of functional decline in persons with PAD. In recognition of her achievements, she was elected a Member of the American Society for Clinical Investigation in 2007.

As an associate professor of medicine in the Division of General Internal Medicine, McDermott found that walking three times a week could significantly improve walking ability and slow progression of those with PAD. She followed up this study in 2010 by testing if exercise could prevent or delay the declining ability to walk in aging adults. The published findings found evidence that clinical guidelines for patients with PAD should be modified to include home-based exercises. In 2011, McDermott was appointed Chair of the Peripheral Vascular Disease Council by the American Heart Association. She also received the designation Master from the Society for Vascular Medicine, the highest award bestowed by the organization, for her "outstanding contributions to the field."

In February 2020, McDermott moved her research team to begin working at the newly opened Clinical Research Hub. Prior to the move, she led a pilot study of 44 patients with PAD to study the effectiveness flavanol-rich cocoa three times a day had on improving walking distance in individuals with peripheral artery disease. During the COVID-19 pandemic in North America, McDermott continued to run tests to measure the efficacy of drug or exercise interventions on Northwestern's downtown campus.

In 2021, McDermott completed a multi-centered randomized clinical trial which showed that, in people with peripheral artery disease (PAD), home-based walking exercise that induced ischemic leg symptoms significantly improved walking performance, while home-based walking exercise conducted without ischemic leg symptoms had no effect on walking performance. It was the first randomized trial to demonstrate this finding. The biological changes that lead to walking improvement have yet to be identified.

== Awards and achievements ==
McDermott became the first holder of the Jeremiah Stamler Professor of Medicine professorship on October 30, 2014. While serving in this role, she was elected a Fellow of the Association of American Physicians for "defining the nature of functional impairment and decline in patients with PAD and leading randomized controlled clinical trials to identify optimal exercise programs that decrease impairments associated with the disease." She also continued to research peripheral extremity artery disease and found that stem cell therapy did not improve walking ability in people in those patients. Following this studies publication, McDermott was named a Distinguished Scientist by the American Heart Association.

In 2021, McDermott received a John M. Eisenberg award for lifetime achievement in research from the Society of General Internal Medicine, along with Diane B. Wayne. The award "recognizes a senior member whose innovative research has changed the way we care for patients, conduct research, or educate students."

McDermott received a Peripheral Vascular Disease Distinguished Achievement Award from the American Heart Association in 2022.

In 2023, McDermott was awarded the 2023 Clinical Research Prize from the American Heart Association to "recognize outstanding contributions to the advancement of clinical science."
