= Coronary Artery Risk Development in Young Adults Study =

Medical Study in the US

The Coronary Artery Risk Development in Young Adults Study (abbreviated as the CARDIA study) is an ongoing, observational, longitudinal cohort study in the United States, examining the development of, and risk factors for, cardiovascular disease. The CARDIA study is funded by the National Heart, Lung and Blood Institute, a division of the National Institutes of Health.

== History ==
The CARDIA study began in 1985 and 1986 with a sample of 5,115 black and white adults between the ages of 18 and 30. When the study began, participants were selected to ensure that the total sample would be about equally distributed across race, age, sex, and education. The original participants were recruited from Birmingham, Alabama, Chicago, Illinois, Minneapolis, Minnesota, and Oakland, California. Since then, the original participants have been contacted eight times for follow-up examinations in the following years: 1987-1988 (Year 2), 1990-1991 (Year 5), 1992-1993 (Year 7), 1995-1996 (Year 10), 2000-2001 (Year 15), 2005-2006 (Year 20), 2010-2011 (Year 25), and 2015-2016 (Year 30). The proportion of original participants who have been examined in each follow-up has varied from a high of 91% in Year 2 to a low of 71% in Year 30. By 2016, the study had produced hundreds of peer-reviewed journal articles that had been cited thousands of times in total.

== Personnel ==
- Donald Lloyd-Jones - principal investigator, CARDIA Chicago field office
- Jared P. Reis - project officer
