= List of damselflies of the world (Isostictidae) =

- Austrosticta fieldi
- Austrosticta frater
- Austrosticta soror
- Cnemisticta angustilobata
- Cnemisticta latilobata
- Eurysticta coolawanyah
- Eurysticta coomalie
- Eurysticta kununurra
- Isosticta banksi
- Isosticta gracilior
- Isosticta handschini
- Isosticta humilior
- Isosticta robustior
- Isosticta spinipes
- Isosticta tillyardi
- Labidiosticta vallisi
- Lithosticta macra
- Neosticta canescens
- Neosticta fraseri
- Neosticta silvarum
- Oristicta filicicola
- Oristicta rosendaleorum
- Rhadinosticta banksi
- Rhadinosticta simplex
- Selysioneura aglaia
- Selysioneura arboricola
- Selysioneura bacillus
- Selysioneura capreola
- Selysioneura cervicornu
- Selysioneura cornelia
- Selysioneura drymobia
- Selysioneura phasma
- Selysioneura ranatra
- Selysioneura rangifera
- Selysioneura rhaphia
- Selysioneura stenomantis
- Selysioneura thalia
- Selysioneura umbratilis
- Selysioneura venilia
- Selysioneura virgula
- Tanymecosticta capillaris
- Tanymecosticta filiformis
- Tanymecosticta fissicollis
- Tanymecosticta jejuna
- Tanymecosticta leptalea
- Tanymecosticta simonae
- Titanosticta macrogaster
