= Wiretail =

Wiretail may refer to:

- Des Murs's wiretail, a bird of southern South America
- Rhadinosticta, also called the powdered wiretail, a genus of damselfly
- Rhadinosticta banksi, the northern wiretail
