= Austrosticta =

Scientific classification
- Kingdom: Animalia
- Phylum: Arthropoda
- Clade: Pancrustacea
- Class: Insecta
- Order: Odonata
- Suborder: Zygoptera
- Family: Isostictidae
- Genus: Austrosticta; Tillyard, 1908

Genus of damselflies

Austrosticta is a genus of damselflies belonging to the family Isostictidae. It is endemic to northern Australia. Species of Austrosticta are medium-sized damselflies, dull grey-brown in colour.

== Etymology ==
The genus name Austrosticta combines the prefix austro- (from Latin auster, meaning "south wind", hence "southern") with -sticta, from Greek στικτός (stiktos, "spotted" or "tattooed").

In 1908, Tillyard proposed the genus Austrosticta for a group allied to Isosticta. The name refers to a southern representative of that group.

== Species ==
The genus Austrosticta includes the following species:

- Austrosticta fieldi Tillyard, 1908
- Austrosticta frater Theischinger, 1997
- Austrosticta soror Sjöstedt, 1917
