= Oristicta rosendaleorum =

Elegant wiretail

Scientific classification
- Kingdom: Animalia
- Phylum: Arthropoda
- Clade: Pancrustacea
- Class: Insecta
- Order: Odonata
- Suborder: Zygoptera
- Family: Isostictidae
- Genus: Oristicta
- Species: O. rosendaleorum

Binomial name
- Oristicta rosendaleorum Theischinger & Burwell, 2017

Species of damselfly

Oristicta rosendaleorum is a species of damselfly belonging to the family Isostictidae. It was described by Theischinger and Burwell in 2017. Until 2017 Oristicta filicicola was the only species of the genus Oristicta which has now been widened to include Oristicta rosendaleorum. The common name suggested for the new species is elegant wiretail.

== Description ==
Oristicta rosendaleorum is a slender and dull-coloured damselfly of medium-size with a length around 42mm, and hind-wing about 21mm . Differences when compared to Oristicta filicicola include richer black markings, altered patterns on the synthorax and abdominal segments, and a lack of posterolateral processes/horns on the male pronotum. The anal appendages of the male take a different form also.

== Distribution ==
As of 2017, five specimens have been collected from two locations, both within 20 km of Lakeland, Queensland, in north-eastern Australia.

== Etymology ==
The genus name Oristicta is derived from the Greek ὄρος (oros, "mountain") and στικτός (stiktos, "spotted" or "marked"). The suffix -sticta is commonly used in names of taxa within the subfamily Isostictinae. The genus was established from specimens collected near the summit of Mount Cook, near Cooktown, Queensland.

In 2017, Günther Theischinger and Chris Burwell named this species rosendaleorum, an eponym honouring Uncle Eric Rosendale and his daughter Barbara Rosendale-Collie, on whose property the species was collected.
