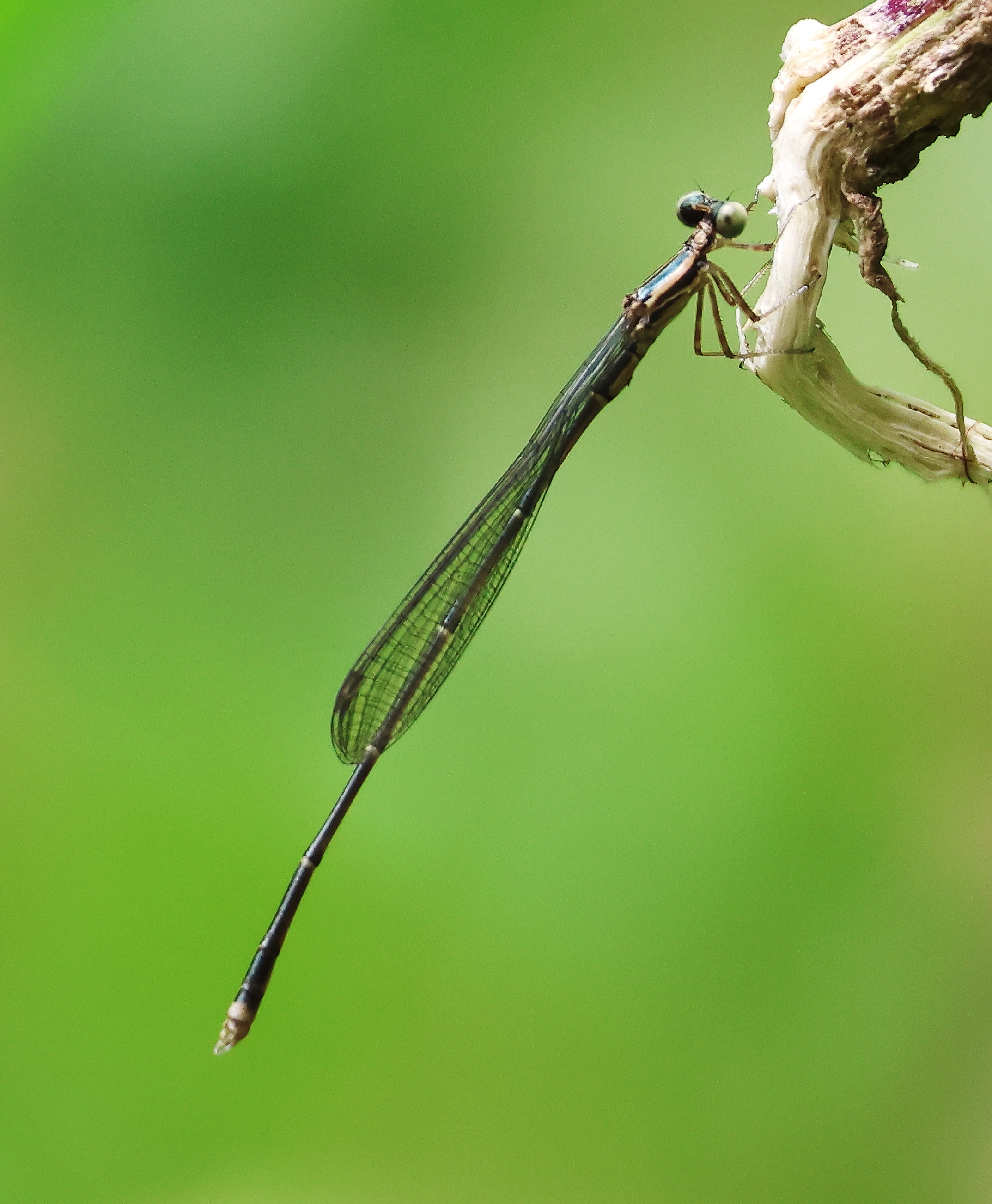

Conservation status
- Least Concern (IUCN 3.1)

Scientific classification
- Kingdom: Animalia
- Phylum: Arthropoda
- Clade: Pancrustacea
- Class: Insecta
- Order: Odonata
- Suborder: Zygoptera
- Family: Isostictidae
- Genus: Rhadinosticta
- Species: R. simplex

Binomial name
- Rhadinosticta simplex (Martin, 1901)

Synonyms
- Isosticta simplex Martin, 1901

= Rhadinosticta simplex =

Species of damselfly

Rhadinosticta simplex is a species of damselfly in the family Isostictidae. It is commonly known as the powdered wiretail. It is located in Australia, where it is fairly common and localised.

== Identification ==
The powdered wiretail is a medium-sized damselfly with a length of 40 millimetres (1.6 in). Its abdomen is very long and slender, and extends well beyond the wing-tips. The damselfly has green eyes, a narrow reddish antehumeral stripe and some narrow broken pale green markings on the side of the thorax. Its abdomen is all black above with distinct pale green sides.

== Behaviour ==
The powdered wiretail has weak fluttery flight. It often flies in shaded areas around vegetation hanging over the stream edge, such as black wattle. Many males in groups can be found perching high up above water.

== Distribution ==
Rhadinosticta simplex has been recorded in Australia from near Cooktown in Queensland to Melbourne in Victoria.

== Habitat ==
Rhadinosticta simplex is found among thick tea-tree beside slow-flowing sections of a river.

== Flight period ==
The damselfly has a flight season from December to April. In Victoria it can be seen in flight during summer and most of autumn. Further north they can emerge earlier.

== Similar species ==
Rhadinosticta simplex is very similar to Rhadinosticta banksi except for more distinct markings on its synthorax, and minor anatomical differences.

== Etymology ==
The genus name Rhadinosticta is derived from the Greek ῥαδινός (rhadinos, "slender") and στικτός (stiktos, "spotted" or "marked"). The suffix -sticta is commonly used in names of taxa within the subfamily Isostictinae.

The species name simplex is Latin for "simple", referring to the arrangement of cells in the wing.

== Gallery ==
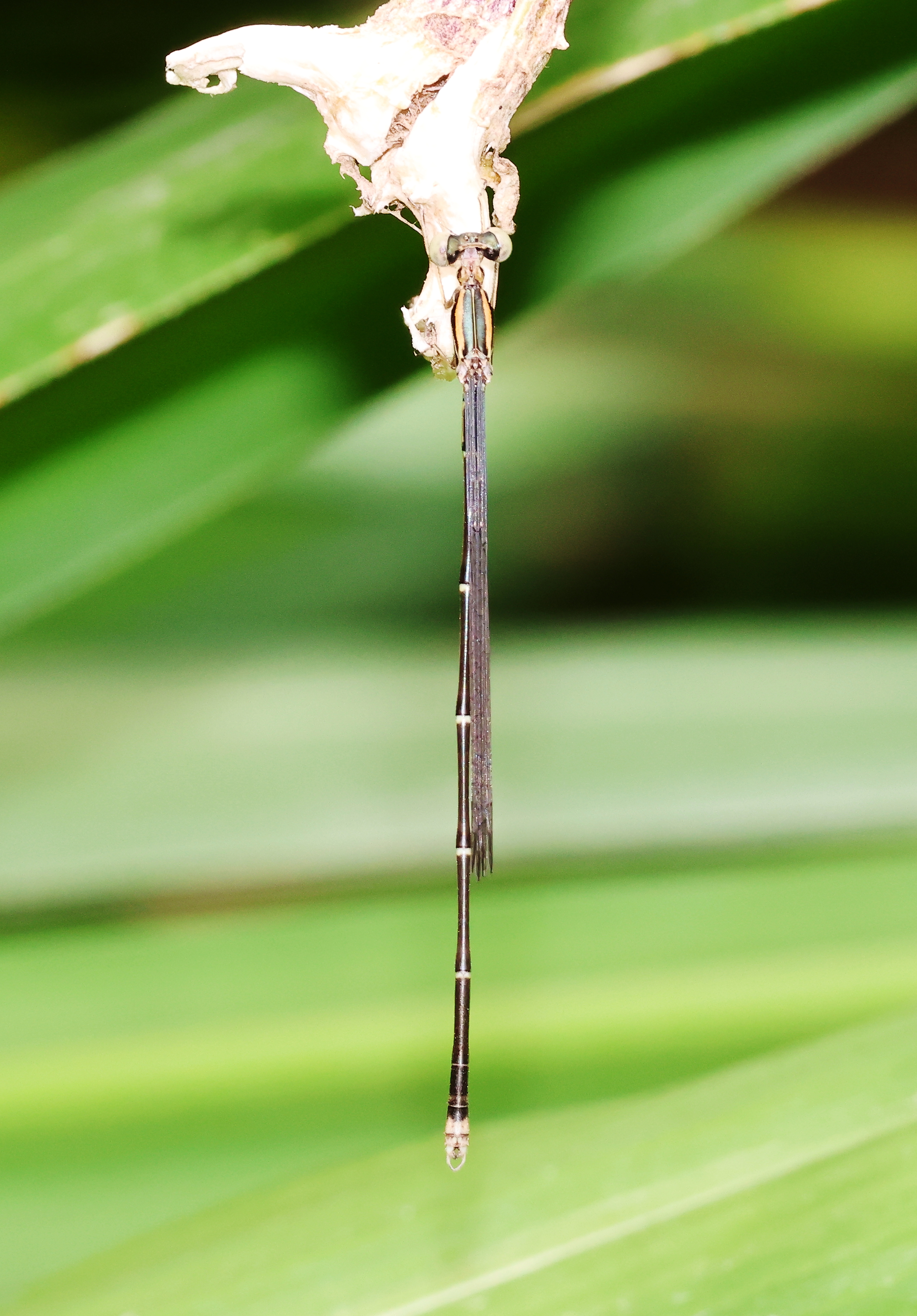
male from above

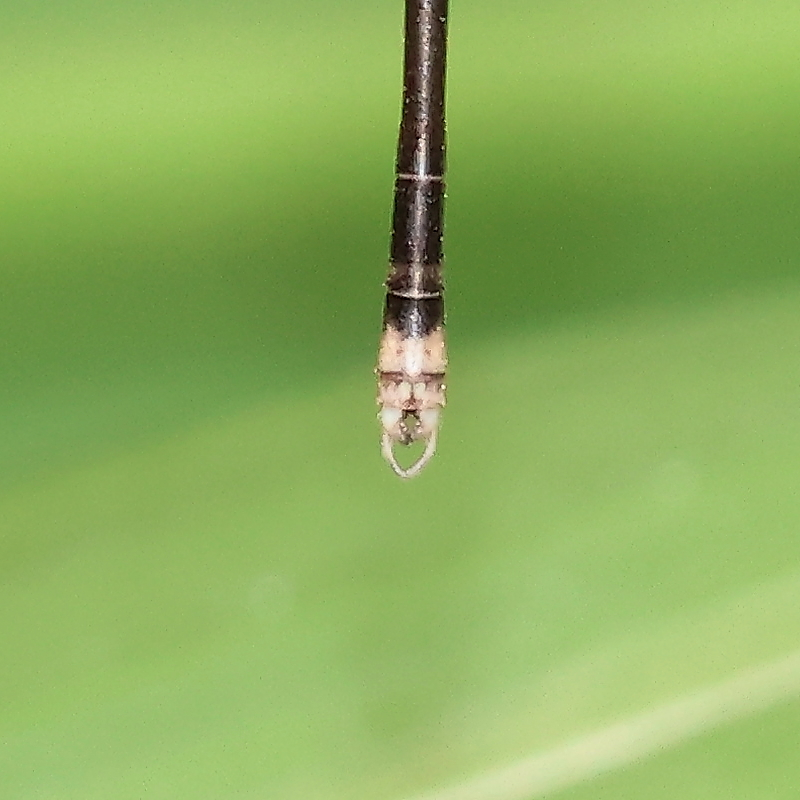
close-up of appendages from above

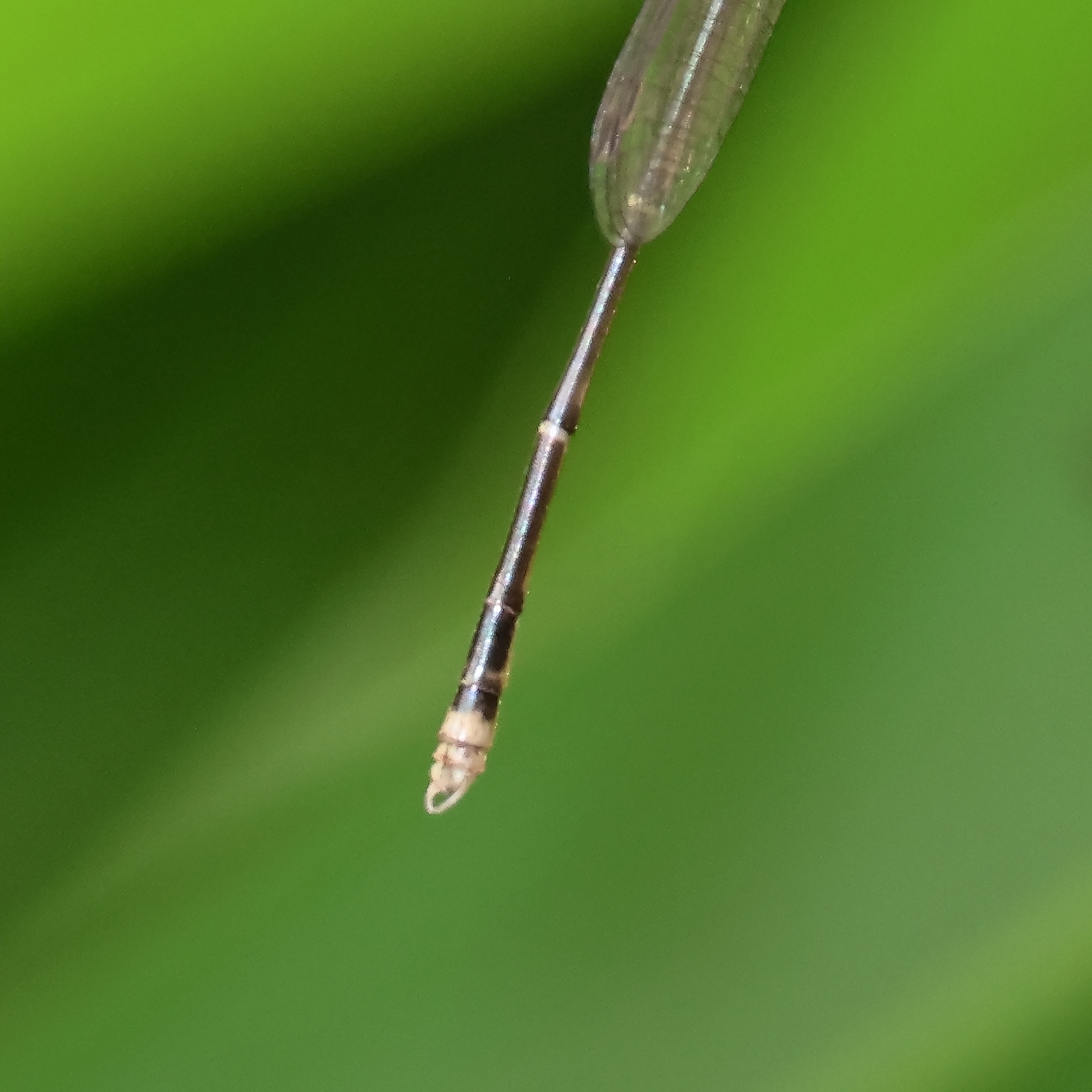
close-up from side quarter

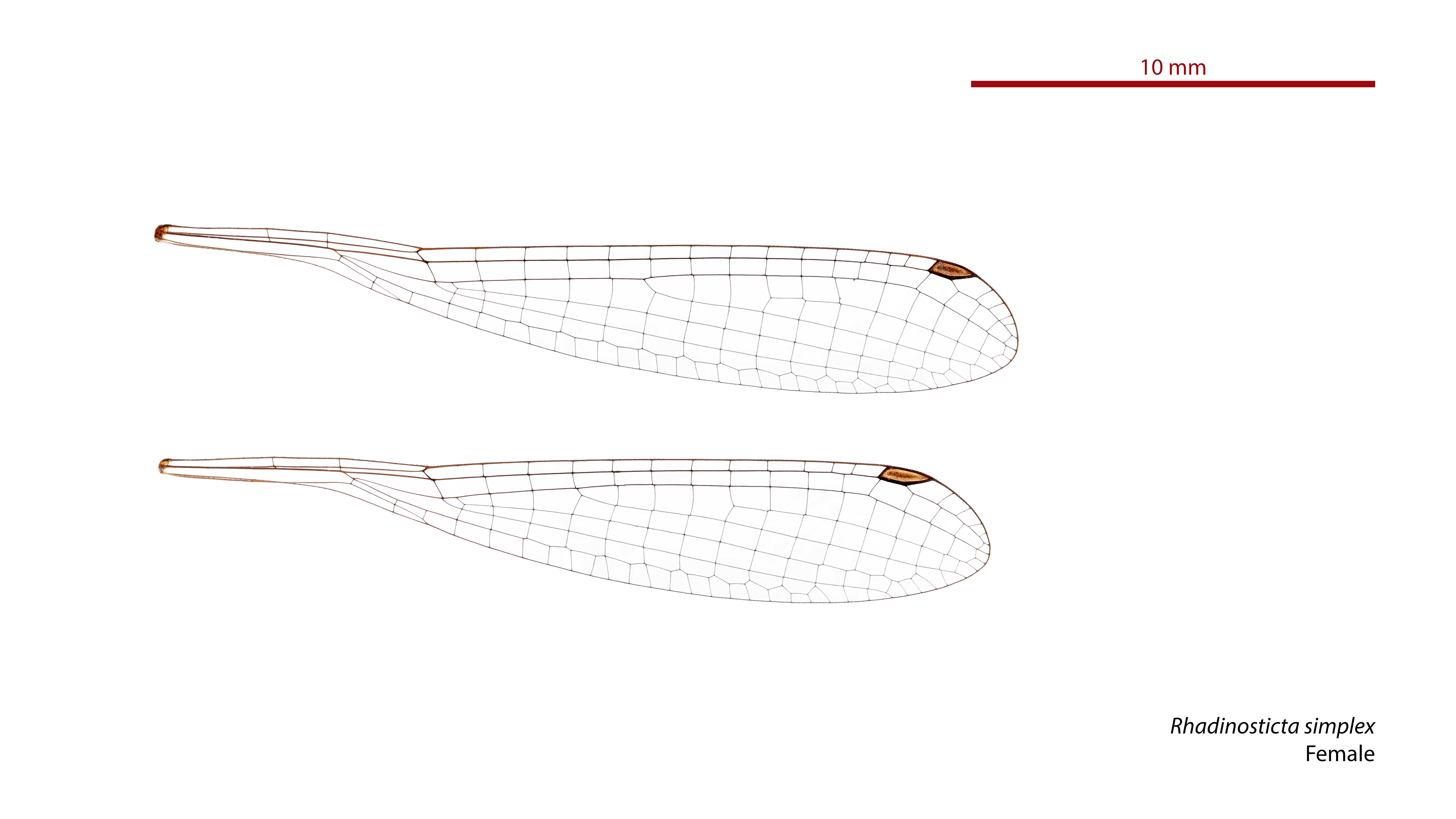
Female wings

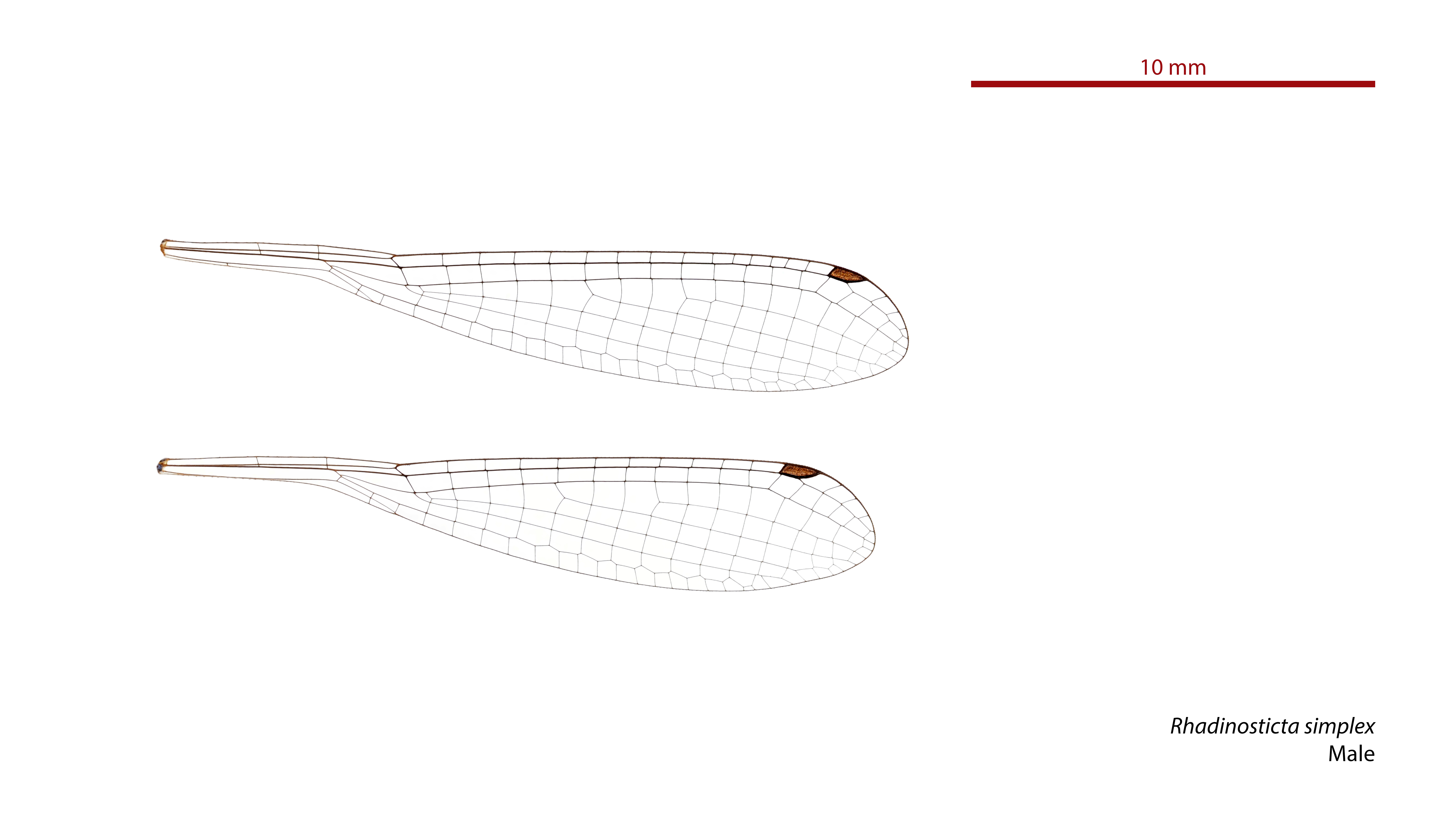
Male wings
