= Titanosticta =

Scientific classification
- Domain: Eukaryota
- Kingdom: Animalia
- Phylum: Arthropoda
- Class: Insecta
- Order: Odonata
- Suborder: Zygoptera
- Family: Isostictidae
- Genus: Titanosticta; Donnelly, 1993
- Species: T. macrogaster

Binomial name
- Titanosticta macrogaster Donnelly, 1993

Genus of damselflies

Titanosticta is a genus of damselflies in the family Isostictidae. There is one described species in Titanosticta, T. macrogaster.
