= Austrosticta frater =

Eastern pondsitter

Conservation status
- Least Concern (IUCN 3.1)

Scientific classification
- Kingdom: Animalia
- Phylum: Arthropoda
- Clade: Pancrustacea
- Class: Insecta
- Order: Odonata
- Suborder: Zygoptera
- Family: Isostictidae
- Genus: Austrosticta
- Species: A. frater

Binomial name
- Austrosticta frater Theischinger, 1997

Species of damselfly

Austrosticta frater is a species of damselfly in the family Isostictidae, commonly known as an eastern pondsitter. It has been recorded only from northern Queensland, Australia, where it inhabits ponds and possibly streams.

Austrosticta frater is a medium-sized damselfly, dull grey-brown in colour with pale markings.

== Etymology ==
The genus name Austrosticta combines the prefix austro- (from Latin auster, meaning "south wind", hence "southern") with -sticta, from Greek στικτός (stiktos, "spotted" or "tattooed").

The species name frater is Latin for "brother", corresponding to sorer, Latin for "sister".

== Gallery ==
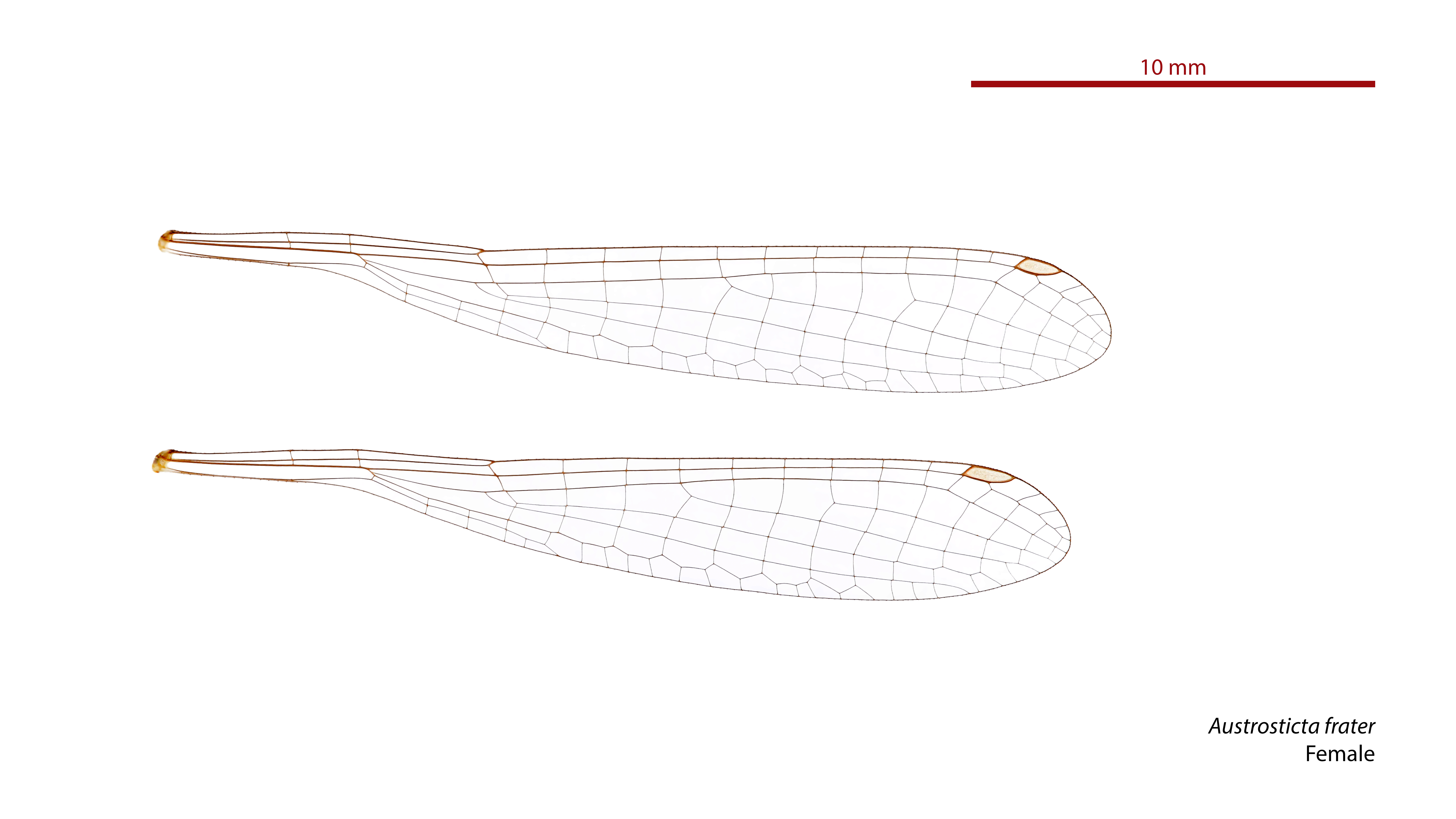
Female wings

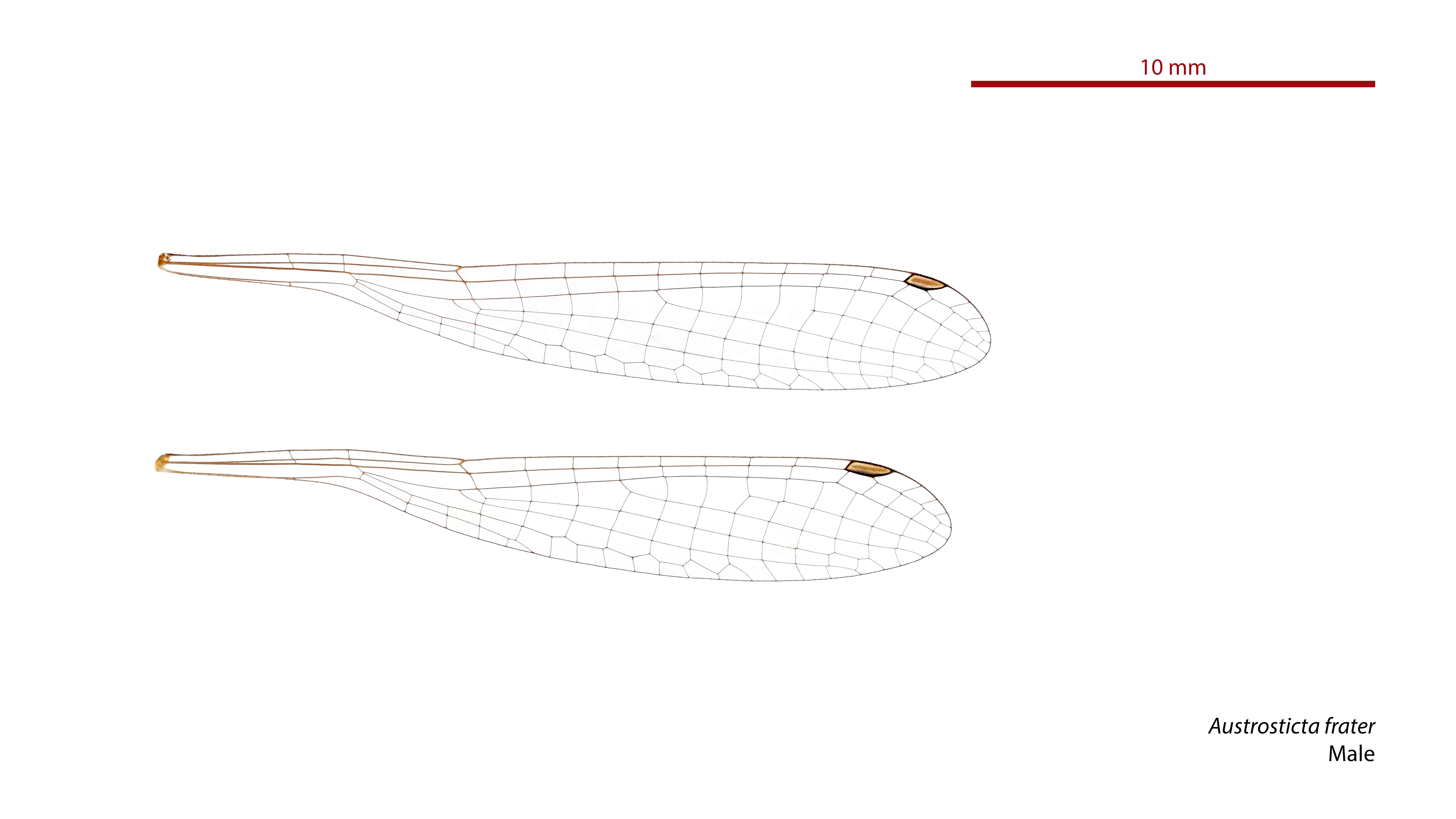
Male wings

== See also ==
- List of Odonata species of Australia
