= Austrosticta soror =

Kimberley pondsitter

Scientific classification
- Kingdom: Animalia
- Phylum: Arthropoda
- Clade: Pancrustacea
- Class: Insecta
- Order: Odonata
- Suborder: Zygoptera
- Family: Isostictidae
- Genus: Austrosticta
- Species: A. soror

Binomial name
- Austrosticta soror Sjöstedt, 1917

Species of damselfly

Austrosticta soror is a species of damselfly in the family Isostictidae, commonly known as a Kimberley pondsitter. It is endemic to the Kimberley region in Western Australia, where it inhabits ponds and streams in gorges.

Austrosticta soror is a dull, dark-coloured, medium-sized damselfly. The female lays her eggs in twigs over water.

== Etymology ==
The genus name Austrosticta combines the prefix austro- (from Latin auster, meaning "south wind", hence "southern") with -sticta, from Greek στικτός (stiktos, "spotted" or "tattooed").

The species name sorer is Latin for "sister", referring to its status as the second species described in the genus.

== Gallery ==
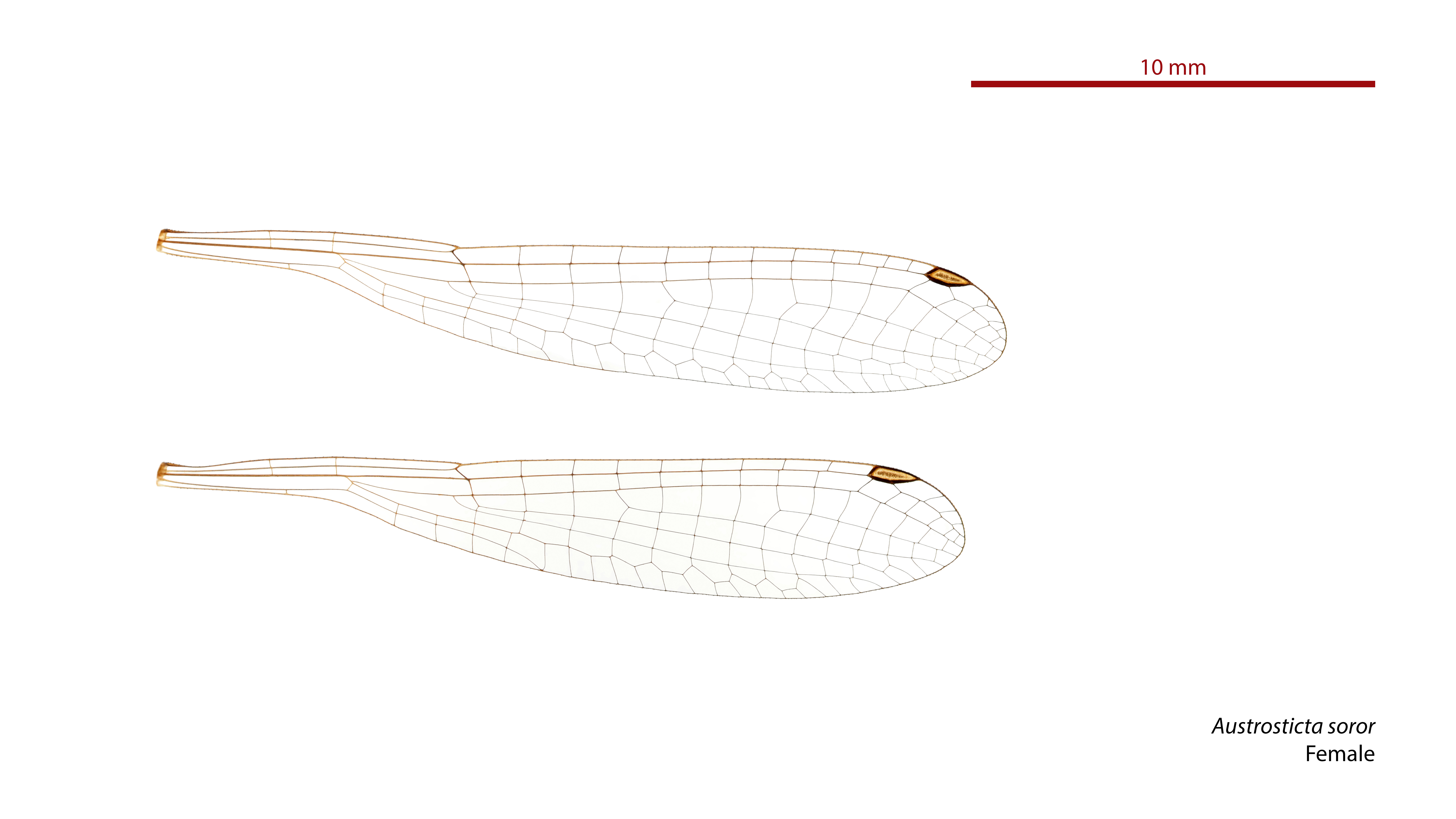
Female wings

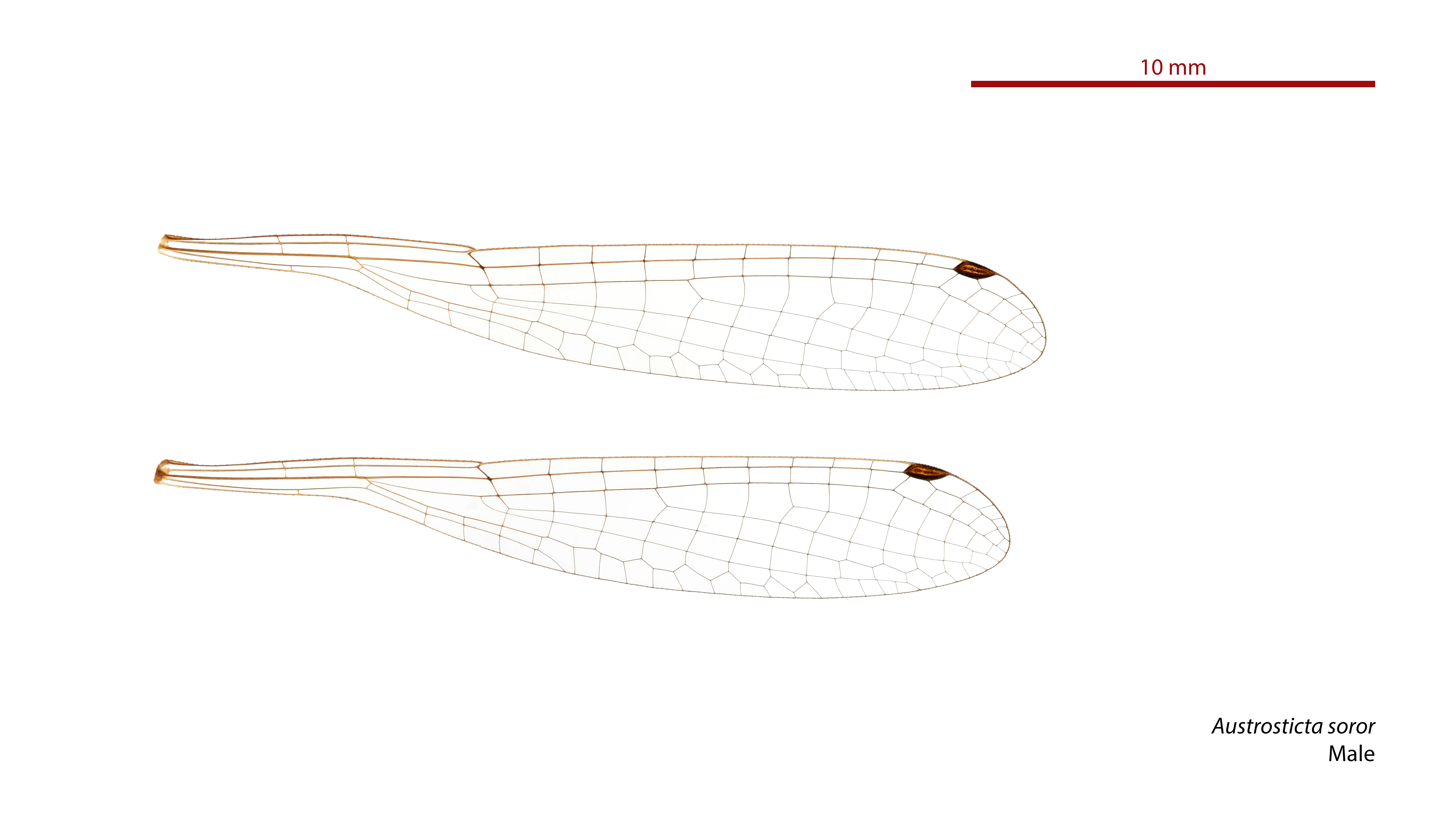
Male wings

== See also ==
- List of Odonata species of Australia
