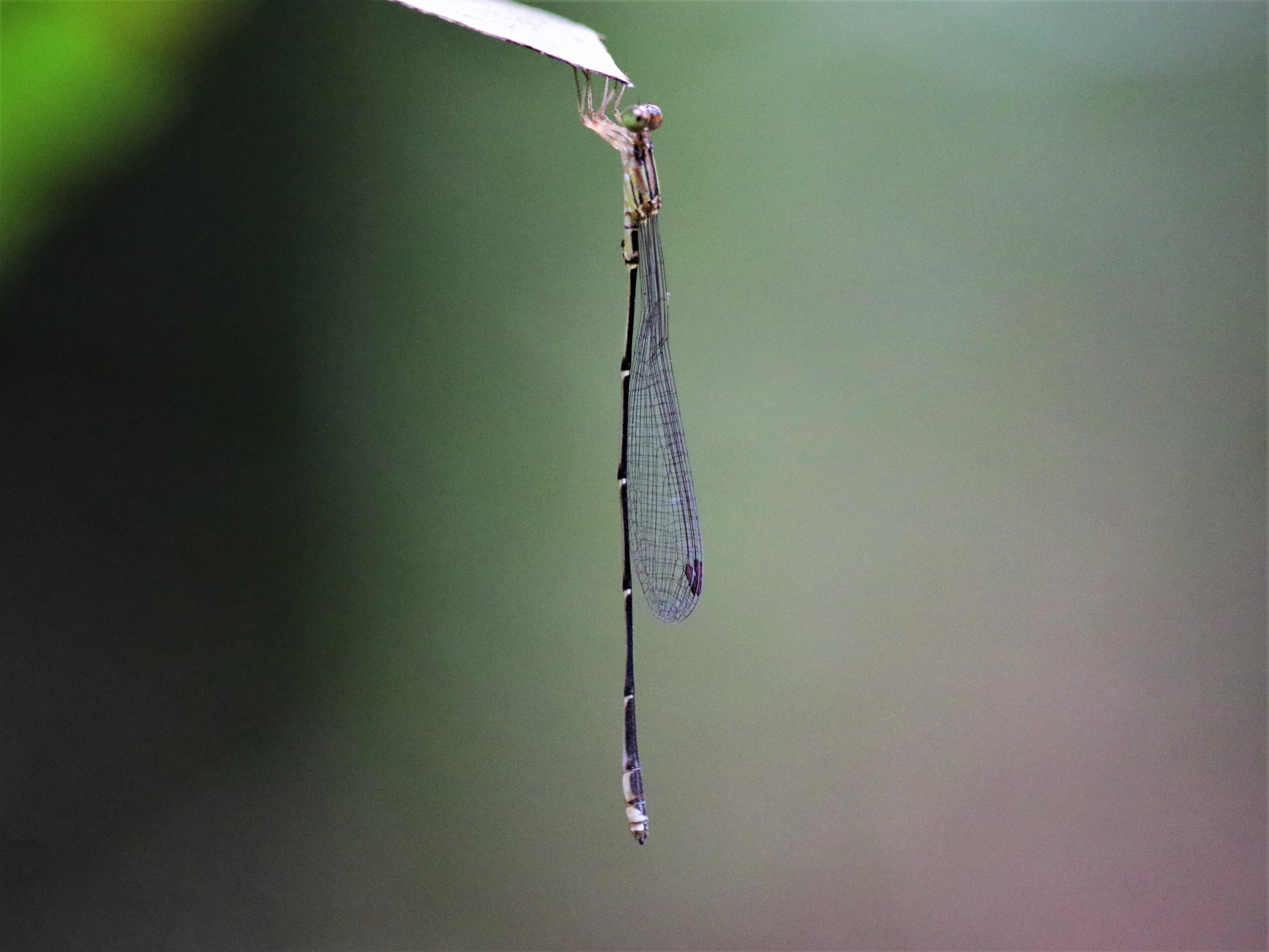
- Male Oristicta filicicola

Scientific classification
- Kingdom: Animalia
- Phylum: Arthropoda
- Clade: Pancrustacea
- Class: Insecta
- Order: Odonata
- Suborder: Zygoptera
- Family: Isostictidae
- Genus: Oristicta; Tillyard, 1913

= Oristicta =

Genus of damselflies

Oristicta is a genus of damselflies belonging to the family Isostictidae. It is endemic to north-eastern Australia. Species of Orosticta are slender, medium-sized damselflies with a dull colouring.

== Species ==
The genus Oristicta includes the following species:

- Oristicta filicicola Tillyard, 1913
- Oristicta rosendaleorum Theischinger & Burwell, 2017

== Etymology ==
The genus name Oristicta is derived from the Greek ὄρος (oros, "mountain") and στικτός (stiktos, "spotted" or "marked"). The suffix -sticta is commonly used in names of taxa within the subfamily Isostictinae. The type species was discovered near the summit of Mount Cook, near Cooktown, Queensland.
