= Selysioneura =

Scientific classification
- Kingdom: Animalia
- Phylum: Arthropoda
- Class: Insecta
- Order: Odonata
- Suborder: Zygoptera
- Family: Isostictidae
- Genus: Selysioneura; Förster, 1900

Genus of damselflies

Selysioneura is a genus of damselflies in the family Isostictidae. There are about 16 described species in Selysioneura.

== Species ==
These 16 species belong to the genus Selysioneura:

- Selysioneura aglaia Lieftinck, 1953
- Selysioneura arboricola Lieftinck, 1959
- Selysioneura bacillus Ris, 1915
- Selysioneura capreola Lieftinck, 1932
- Selysioneura cervicornu Förster, 1900
- Selysioneura cornelia Lieftinck, 1953
- Selysioneura drymobia Lieftinck, 1959
- Selysioneura phasma Lieftinck, 1932
- Selysioneura ranatra Lieftinck, 1949
- Selysioneura rangifera Lieftinck, 1959
- Selysioneura rhaphia Lieftinck, 1959
- Selysioneura stenomantis Lieftinck, 1932
- Selysioneura thalia Lieftinck, 1953
- Selysioneura umbratilis Lieftinck, 1932
- Selysioneura venilia Lieftinck, 1953
- Selysioneura virgula Lieftinck, 1959
