= Tanymecosticta =

Scientific classification
- Kingdom: Animalia
- Phylum: Arthropoda
- Clade: Pancrustacea
- Class: Insecta
- Order: Odonata
- Suborder: Zygoptera
- Family: Isostictidae
- Genus: Tanymecosticta; Lieftinck, 1935

Genus of damselflies

Tanymecosticta is a genus of damselflies in the family Isostictidae. There are about six described species in Tanymecosticta.

== Species ==
These six species belong to the genus Tanymecosticta:

- Tanymecosticta capillaris Lieftinck, 1959
- Tanymecosticta filiformis (Ris, 1898)
- Tanymecosticta fissicollis (Lieftinck, 1932)
- Tanymecosticta jejuna Lieftinck, 1959
- Tanymecosticta leptalea Lieftinck, 1959
- Tanymecosticta simonae Lieftinck, 1969
