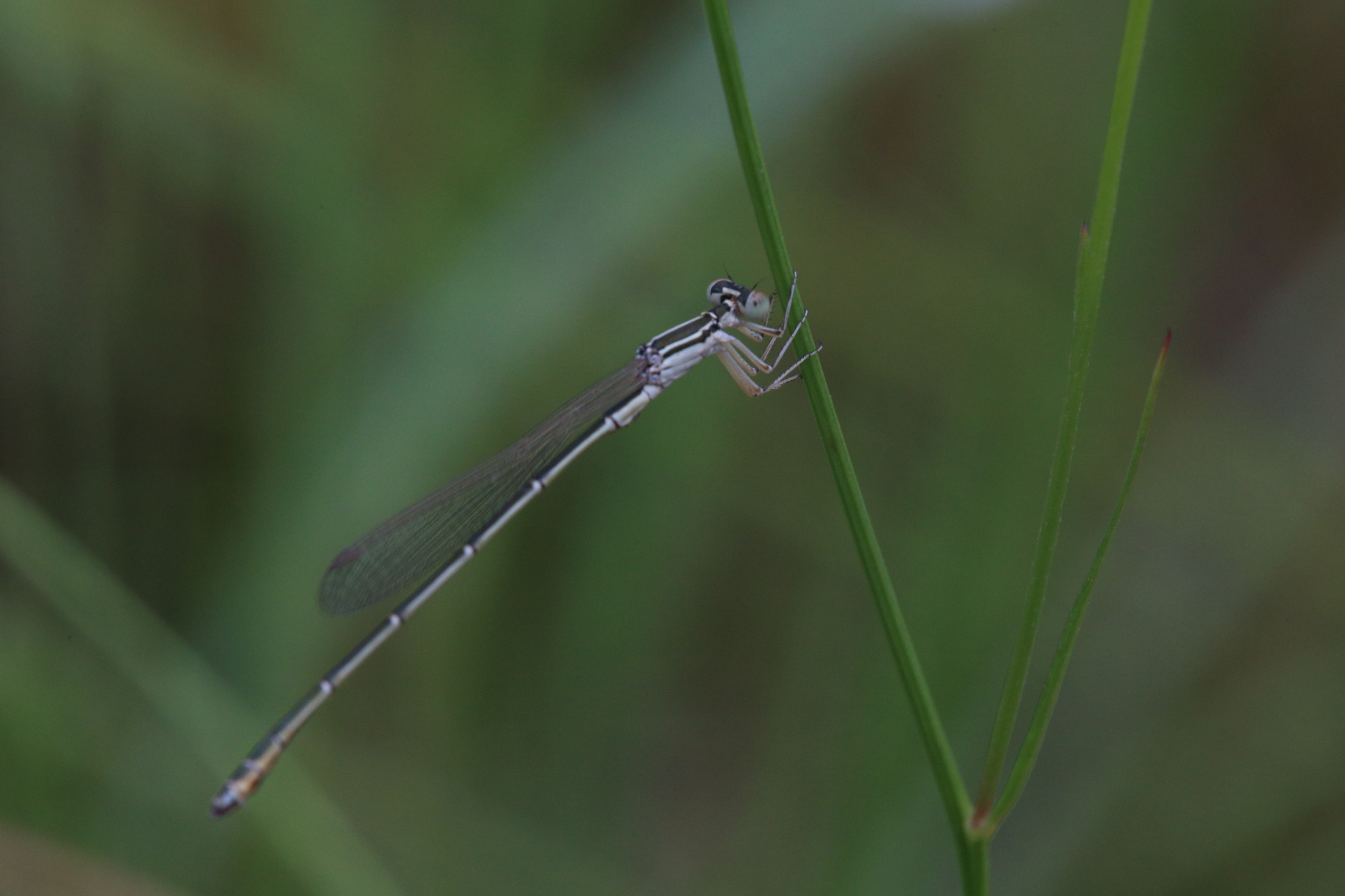

Conservation status
- Least Concern (IUCN 3.1)

Scientific classification
- Kingdom: Animalia
- Phylum: Arthropoda
- Clade: Pancrustacea
- Class: Insecta
- Order: Odonata
- Suborder: Zygoptera
- Family: Isostictidae
- Genus: Austrosticta
- Species: A. fieldi

Binomial name
- Austrosticta fieldi Tillyard, 1908

= Austrosticta fieldi =

Northern pondsitter

Species of damselfly

Austrosticta fieldi is a species of damselfly in the family Isostictidae, commonly known as a northern pondsitter. It has been recorded from Northern Territory, Australia, where it inhabits streams.

Austrosticta fieldi is a medium-sized damselfly, coloured a dull grey-brown with some pale markings.

== Etymology ==
The genus name Austrosticta combines the prefix austro- (from Latin auster, meaning "south wind", hence "southern") with -sticta, from Greek στικτός (stiktos, "spotted" or "tattooed").

In 1908, Robin Tillyard named this species fieldi, an eponym honouring the collector James F. Field of Tennant Creek, Northern Territory.

== Gallery ==
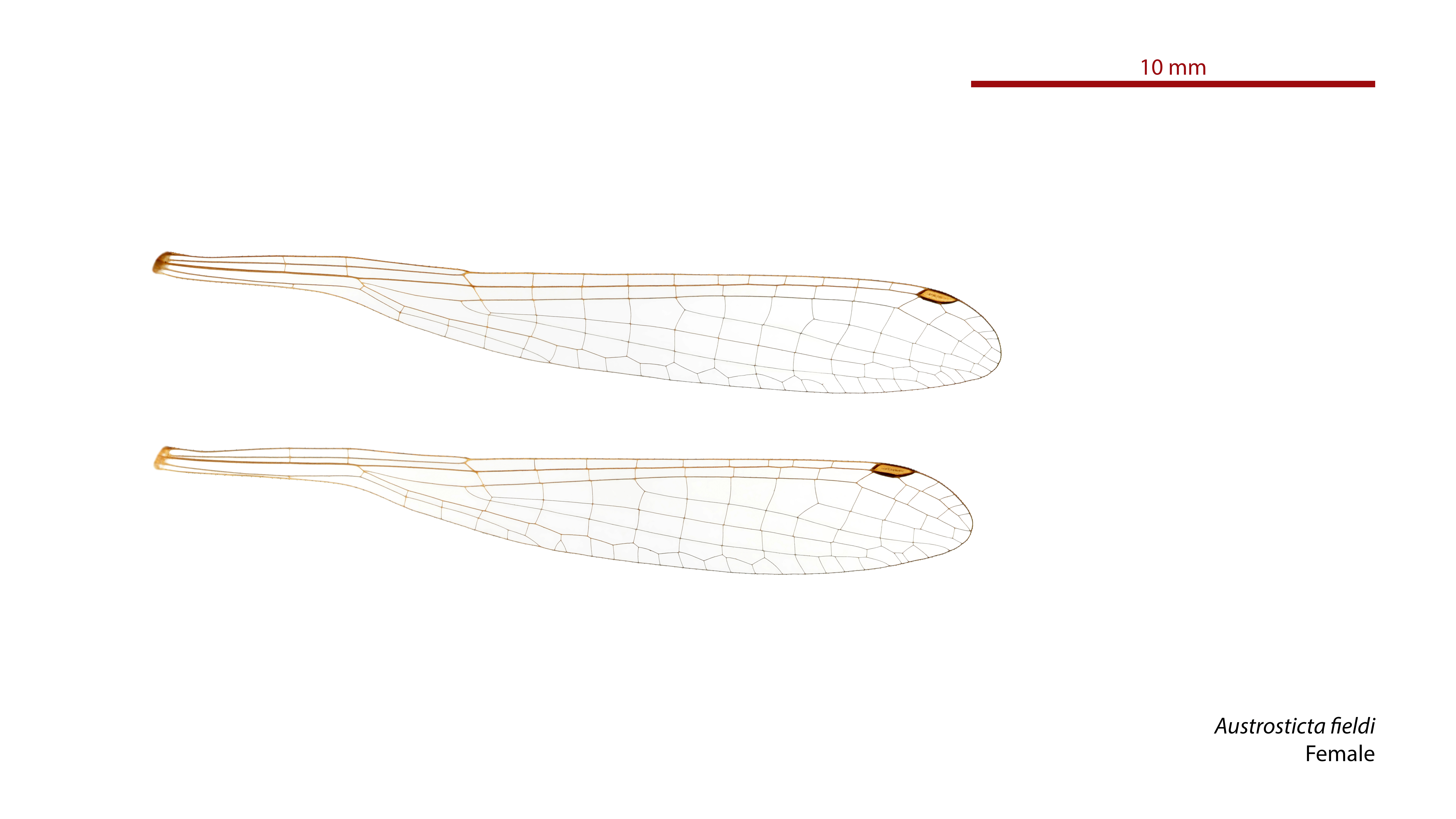
Female wings

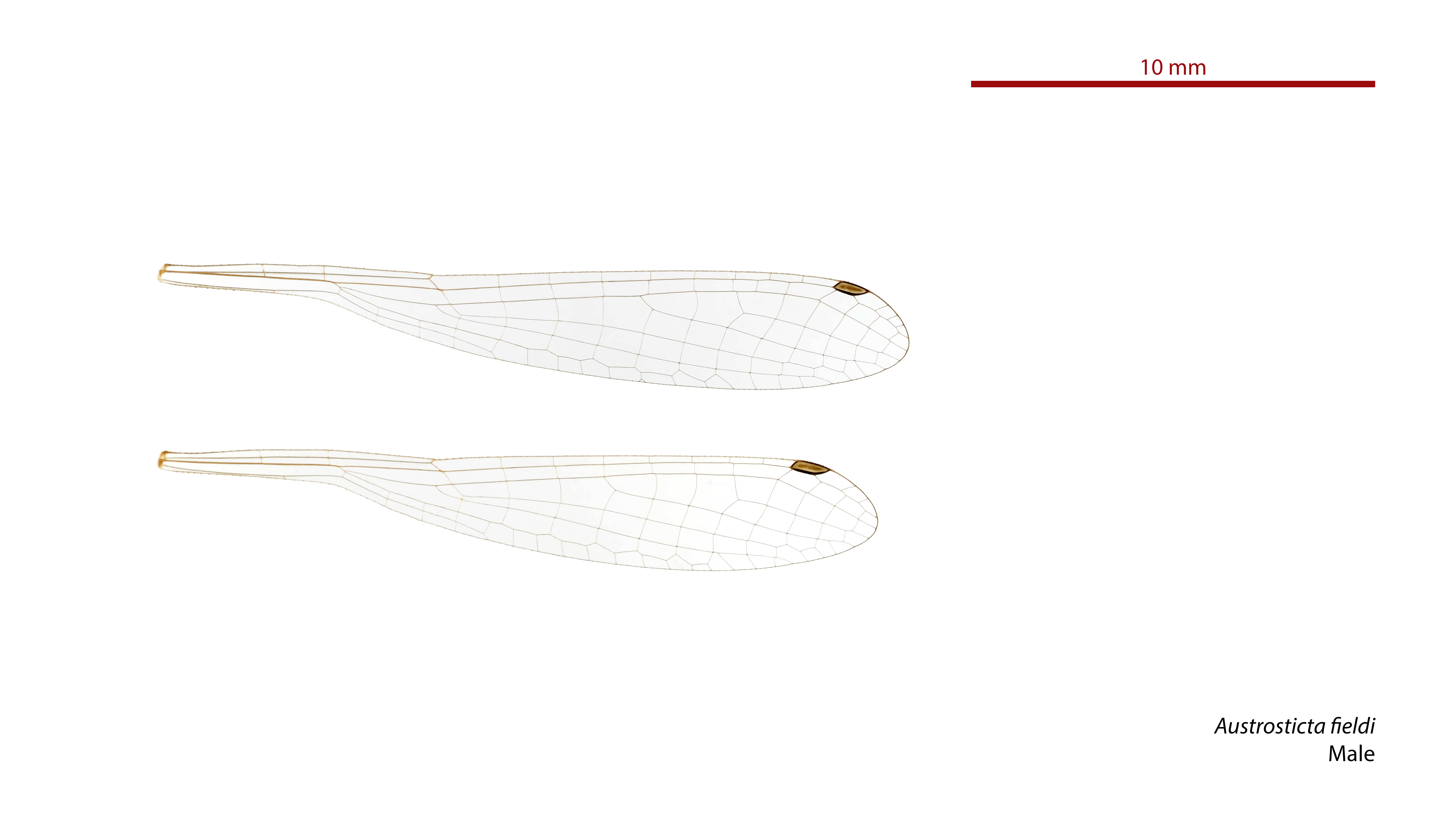
Male wings

== See also ==
- List of Odonata species of Australia
