= Cnemisticta =

Scientific classification
- Domain: Eukaryota
- Kingdom: Animalia
- Phylum: Arthropoda
- Class: Insecta
- Order: Odonata
- Suborder: Zygoptera
- Family: Isostictidae
- Genus: Cnemisticta; Donnelly, 1993

Genus of damselflies

Cnemisticta is a genus of damselflies in the family Isostictidae. There are at least two described species in Cnemisticta.

== Species ==
These two species belong to the genus Cnemisticta:

- Cnemisticta angustilobata Donnelly, 1993
- Cnemisticta latilobata Donnelly, 1993
