= Isosticta =

Scientific classification
- Kingdom: Animalia
- Phylum: Arthropoda
- Clade: Pancrustacea
- Class: Insecta
- Order: Odonata
- Suborder: Zygoptera
- Family: Isostictidae
- Genus: Isosticta; Selys, 1885

Genus of damselflies

Isosticta is a genus of damselflies in the family Isostictidae. Species of Isosticta are indigenous to New Caledonia.

== Description ==
Species of Isosticta are slender damselflies with narrow wings and a generally subdued colouration. They are typically associated with streams and other freshwater habitats. Members of the genus can be distinguished from related genera by features of the wing venation and the spiny legs, a character reflected in the type species Isosticta spinipes.

== Taxonomic history ==
Selys established Isosticta in 1885 within his Legion Protonevra, separating it from Alloneura on the basis of its spiny legs and differences in wing venation. The type species, Isosticta spinipes, was described from New Caledonia. The genus later became the type genus of the family Isostictidae, a lineage of damselflies largely confined to Australia, New Guinea, New Caledonia and neighbouring islands.

== Species ==
The following species are currently placed in Isosticta:

- Isosticta gracilior Lieftinck, 1975
- Isosticta humilior Lieftinck, 1975
- Isosticta robustior Ris, 1915
- Isosticta spinipes Selys, 1885
- Isosticta tillyardi Campion, 1921

== Etymology ==
The genus name Isosticta is derived from the Greek ἴσος (isos, "equal") and στικτός (stiktos, "spotted" or "marked"), possibly referring to the similar pterostigma. The suffix -sticta is also common in names associated with the Protonerva group of subgenera.
