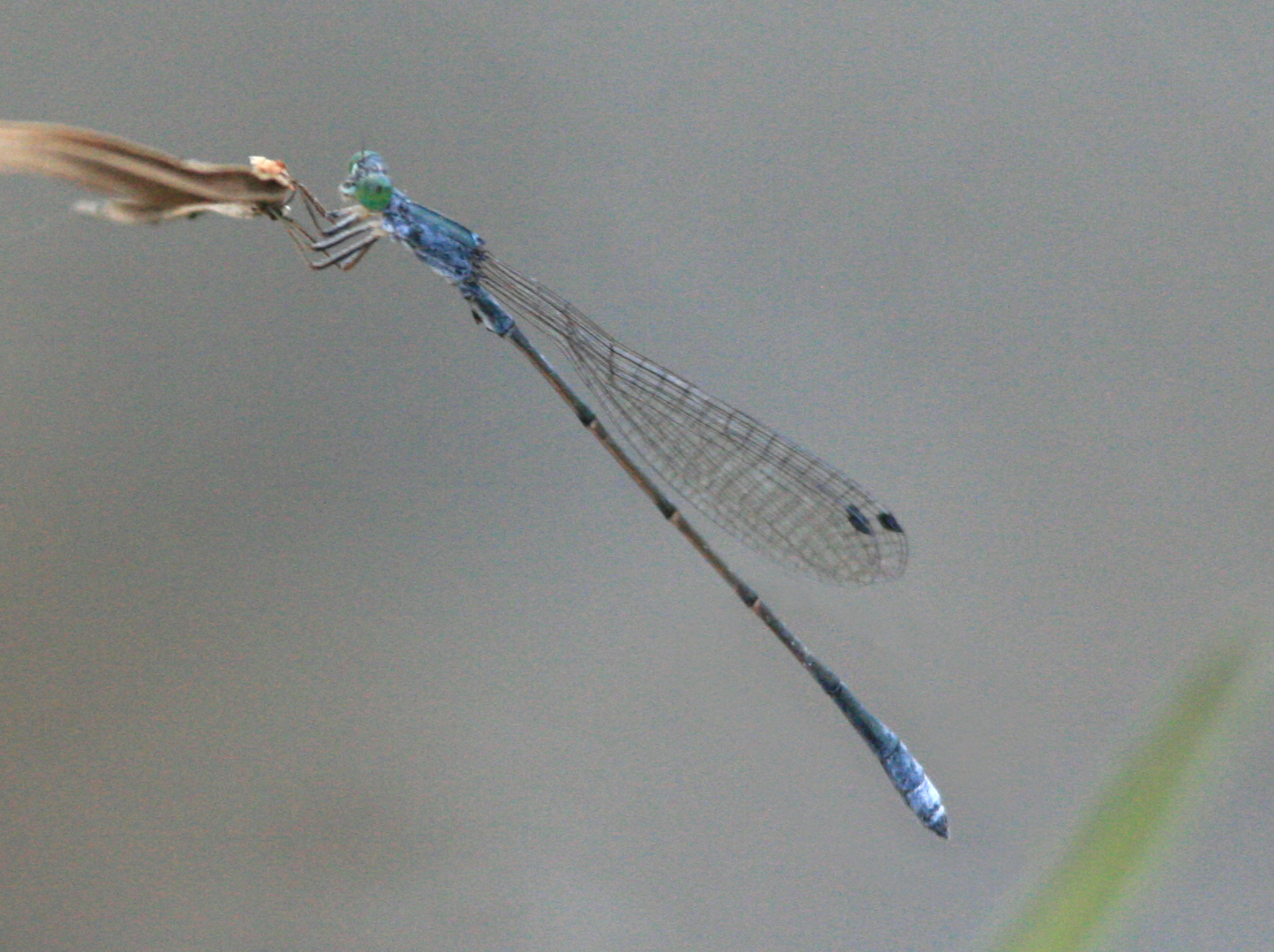
- Rhadinosticta banksi

Scientific classification
- Kingdom: Animalia
- Phylum: Arthropoda
- Clade: Pancrustacea
- Class: Insecta
- Order: Odonata
- Suborder: Zygoptera
- Family: Isostictidae
- Genus: Rhadinosticta; Watson, 1991

= Rhadinosticta =

Genus of damselflies

Rhadinosticta is a genus of damselfly in the family Isostictidae, endemic to eastern Australia. Species of Rhadinosticta are slender, medium-sized damselflies, with a dull colouring.

== Species ==
The genus Rhadinosticta includes the following species:

- Rhadinosticta banksi (Tillyard, 1913) Northern wiretail
- Rhadinosticta simplex (Martin, 1901) Powdered wiretail

== Etymology ==
The genus name Rhadinosticta is derived from the Greek ῥαδινός (rhadinos, "slender") and στικτός (stiktos, "spotted" or "marked"). The suffix -sticta is commonly used in names of taxa within the subfamily Isostictinae.
