= Lithosticta =

Rock narrow-wing

Conservation status
- Vulnerable (IUCN 3.1)

Scientific classification
- Kingdom: Animalia
- Phylum: Arthropoda
- Clade: Pancrustacea
- Class: Insecta
- Order: Odonata
- Suborder: Zygoptera
- Family: Isostictidae
- Genus: Lithosticta; Watson, 1991
- Species: L. macra

Binomial name
- Lithosticta macra Watson, 1991

Genus of damselflies

Lithosticta is a monotypic genus of Australian damselflies belonging to the family Isostictidae. The single species of this genus, Lithosticta macra, commonly known as a rock narrow-wing, is endemic to Arnhem Land in Northern Territory, where it inhabits streams and rivers.

== Etymology ==
The genus name Lithosticta is derived from the Greek λίθος (lithos, "stone") and στικτός (stiktos, "spotted" or "marked"). The suffix -sticta is commonly used in names of taxa within the subfamily Isostictinae.

The species name macra is derived from the Latin macer ("lean" or "slender"), referring to its elongated form.

== Gallery ==
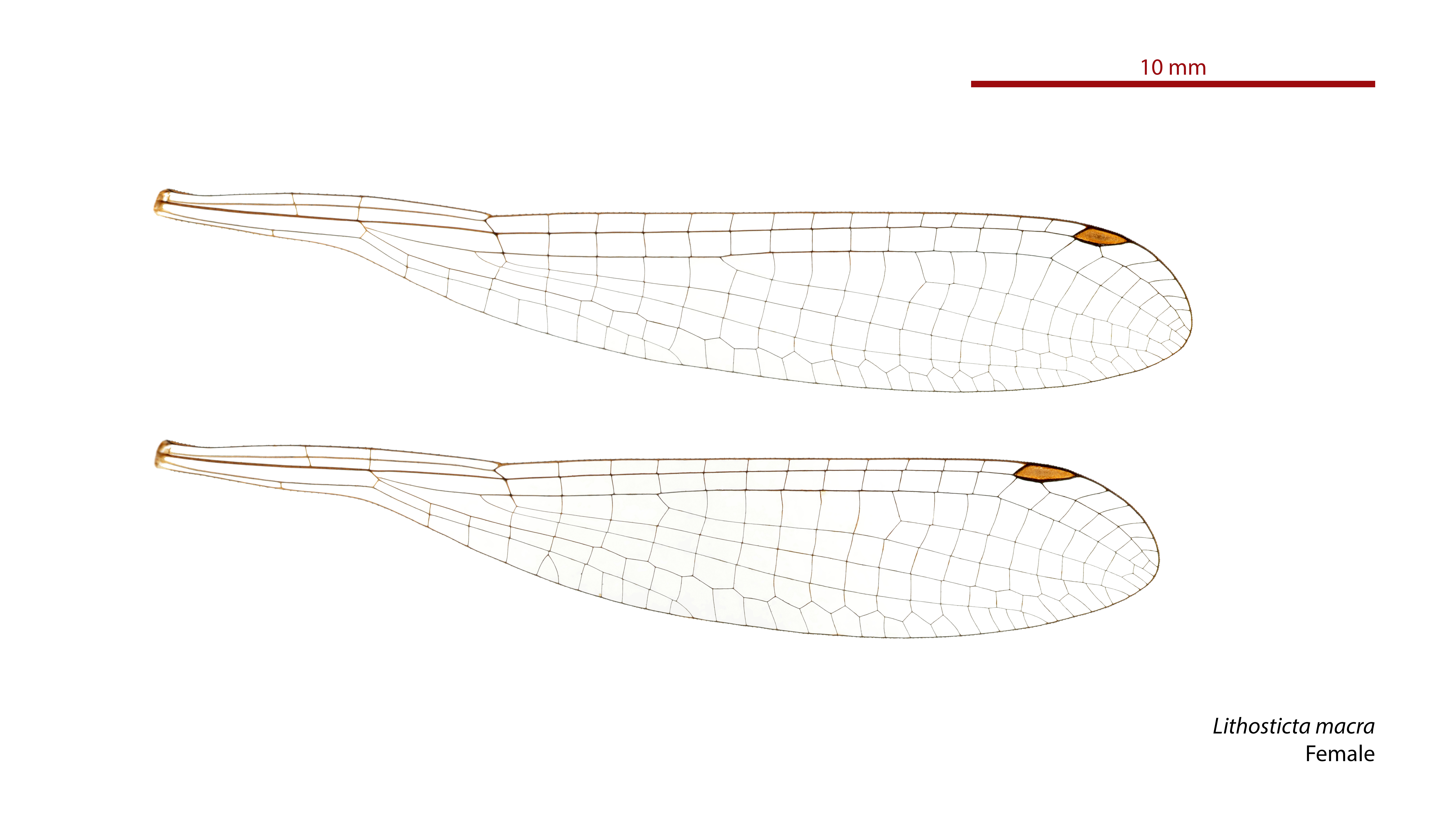
Female Lithosticta macra wings

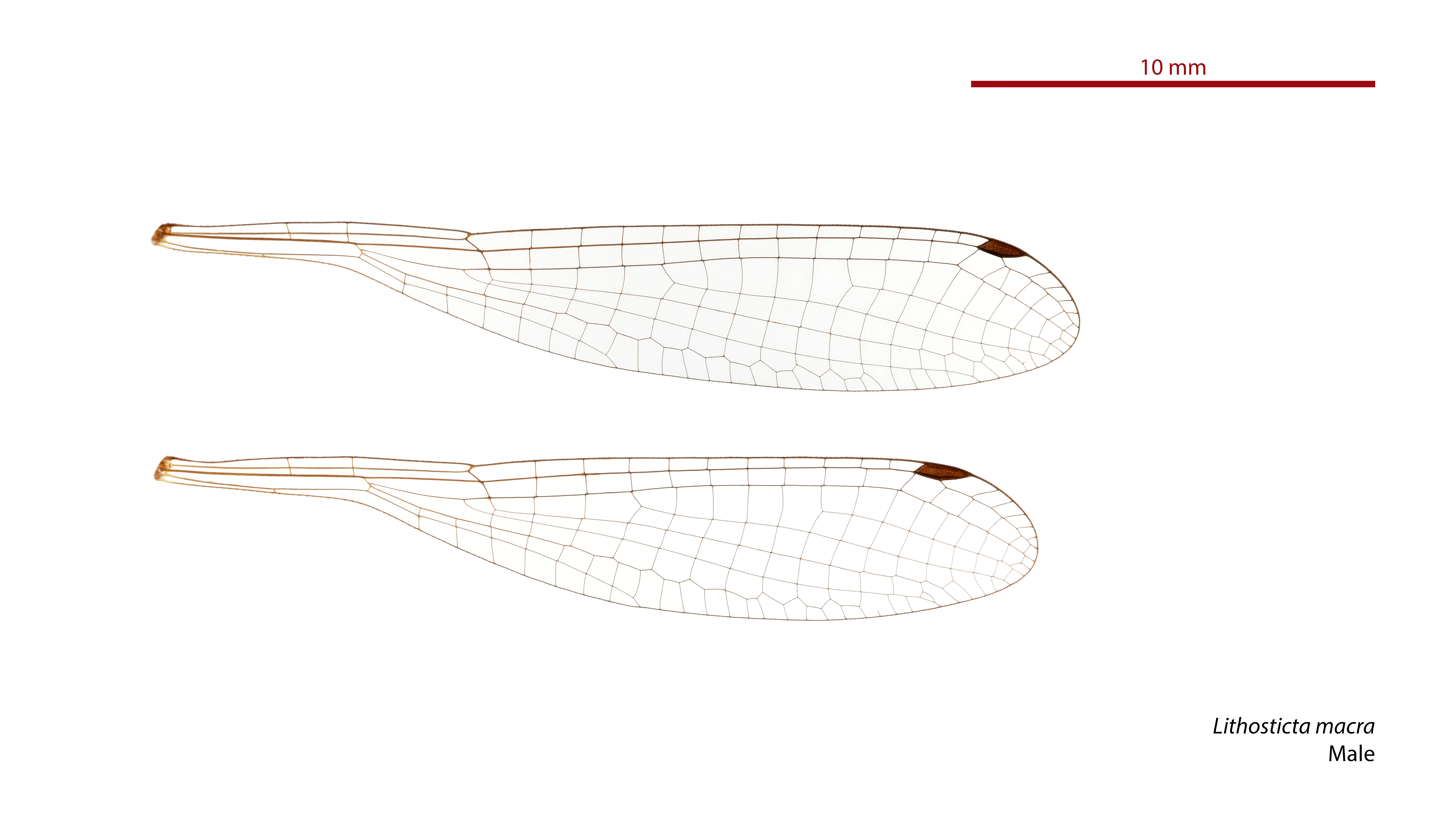
Male Lithosticta macra wings
