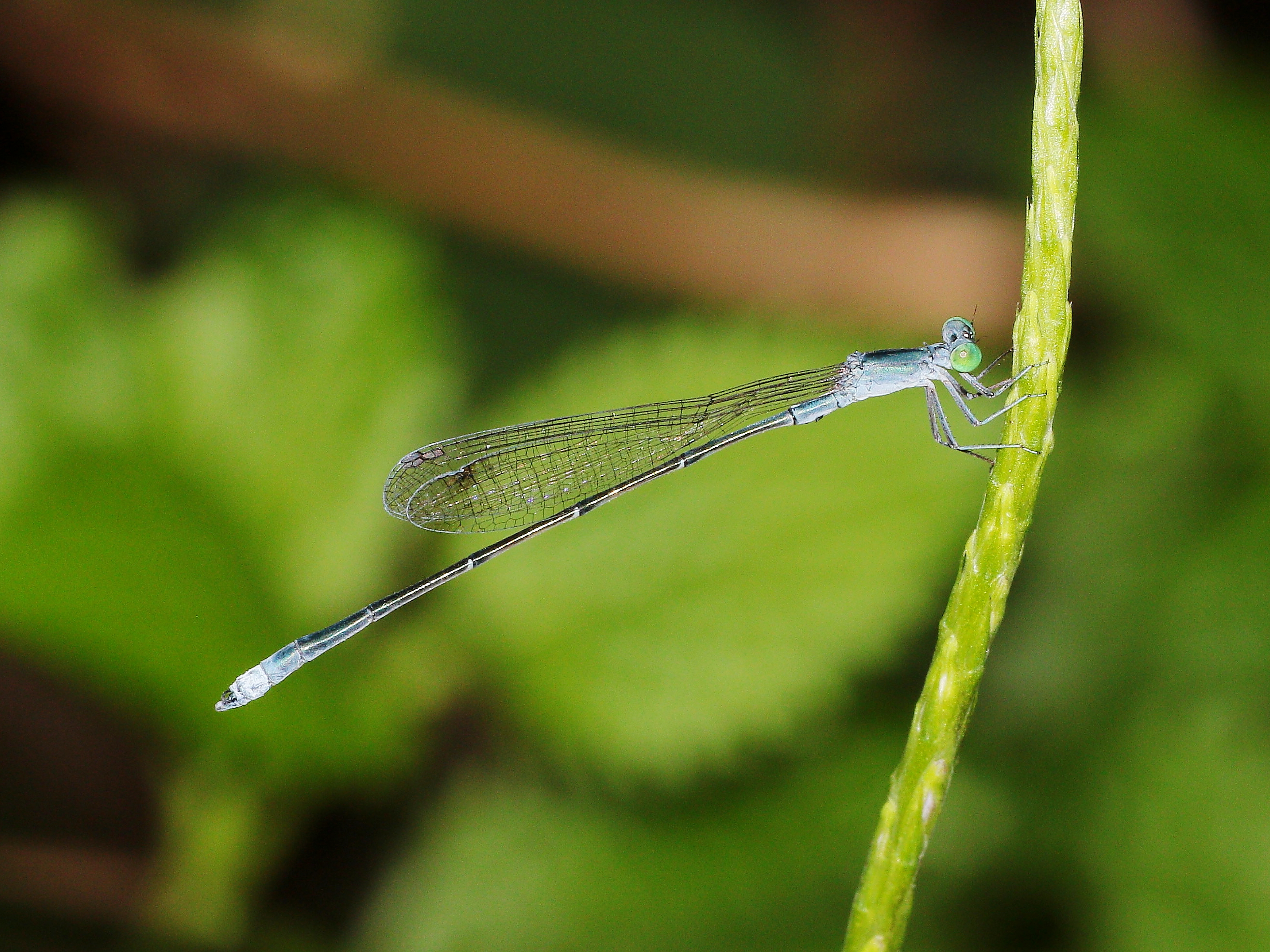
- Northern wiretail

Conservation status
- Least Concern (IUCN 3.1)

Scientific classification
- Kingdom: Animalia
- Phylum: Arthropoda
- Clade: Pancrustacea
- Class: Insecta
- Order: Odonata
- Suborder: Zygoptera
- Family: Isostictidae
- Genus: Rhadinosticta
- Species: R. banksi

Binomial name
- Rhadinosticta banksi (Tillyard, 1913)

Synonyms
- Isosticta banksi Tillyard, 1913; Isosticta handschini Lieftinck, 1933

= Rhadinosticta banksi =

Species of damselfly

Rhadinosticta banksi is an Australian species of damselfly in the family Isostictidae, commonly known as the northern wiretail.

Northern wiretail prefers fresh water streams and pools. The adult is a small to medium-sized damselfly with a length of 35 to 40mm, with the hindwing 20 to 25mm. They are dull in colour with a bluish thorax and may have pruinescence toward the end of the abdomen. In Australia, the distribution is in suitable habitat from Broome, Western Australia, across the north of the continent to the southern Queensland border. The taxon has been assessed in the IUCN Red List as least concern.

== Taxonomy ==
Rhadinosticta handschini, described by Lieftinck in 1933, has recently been made a synonym of Rhadinosticta banksi.

== Etymology ==
The genus name Rhadinosticta is derived from the Greek ῥαδινός (rhadinos, "slender") and στικτός (stiktos, "spotted" or "marked"). The suffix -sticta is commonly used in names of taxa within the subfamily Isostictinae.

The species name banksi is named for Banks Island in Torres Strait, where the original specimens of this species were collected.

== Gallery ==
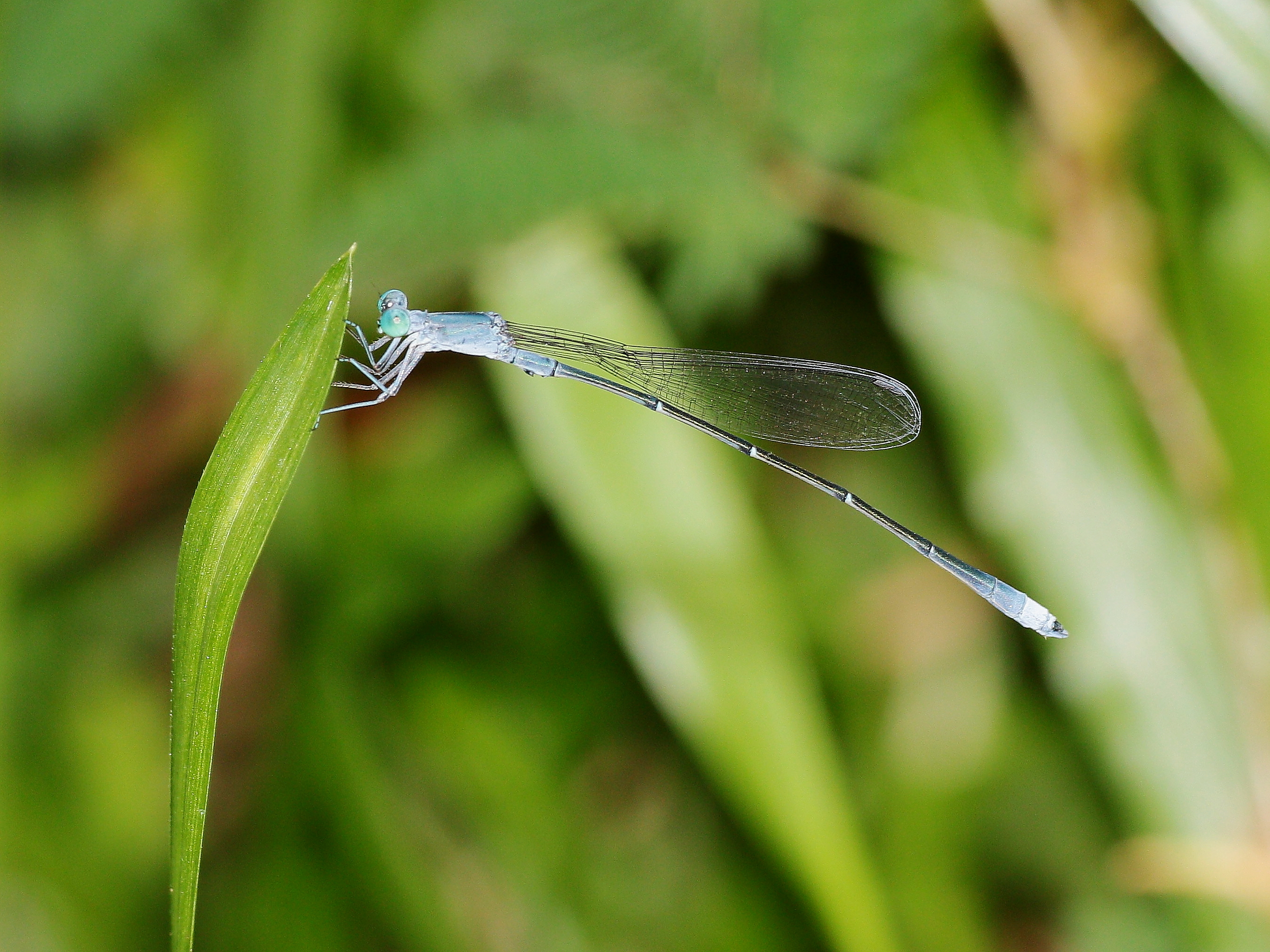
Male in Cairns, Queensland

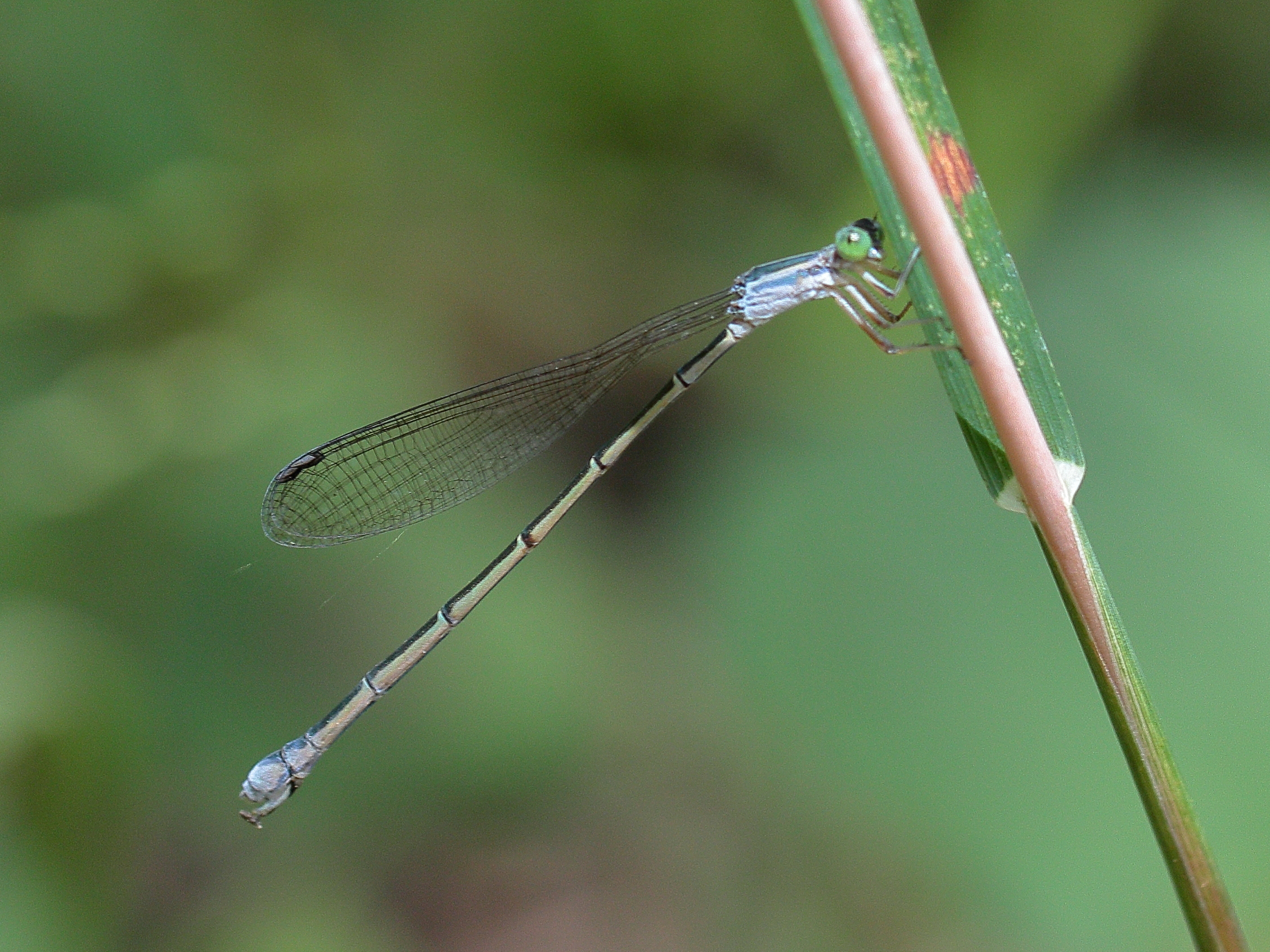
Female, right hand side

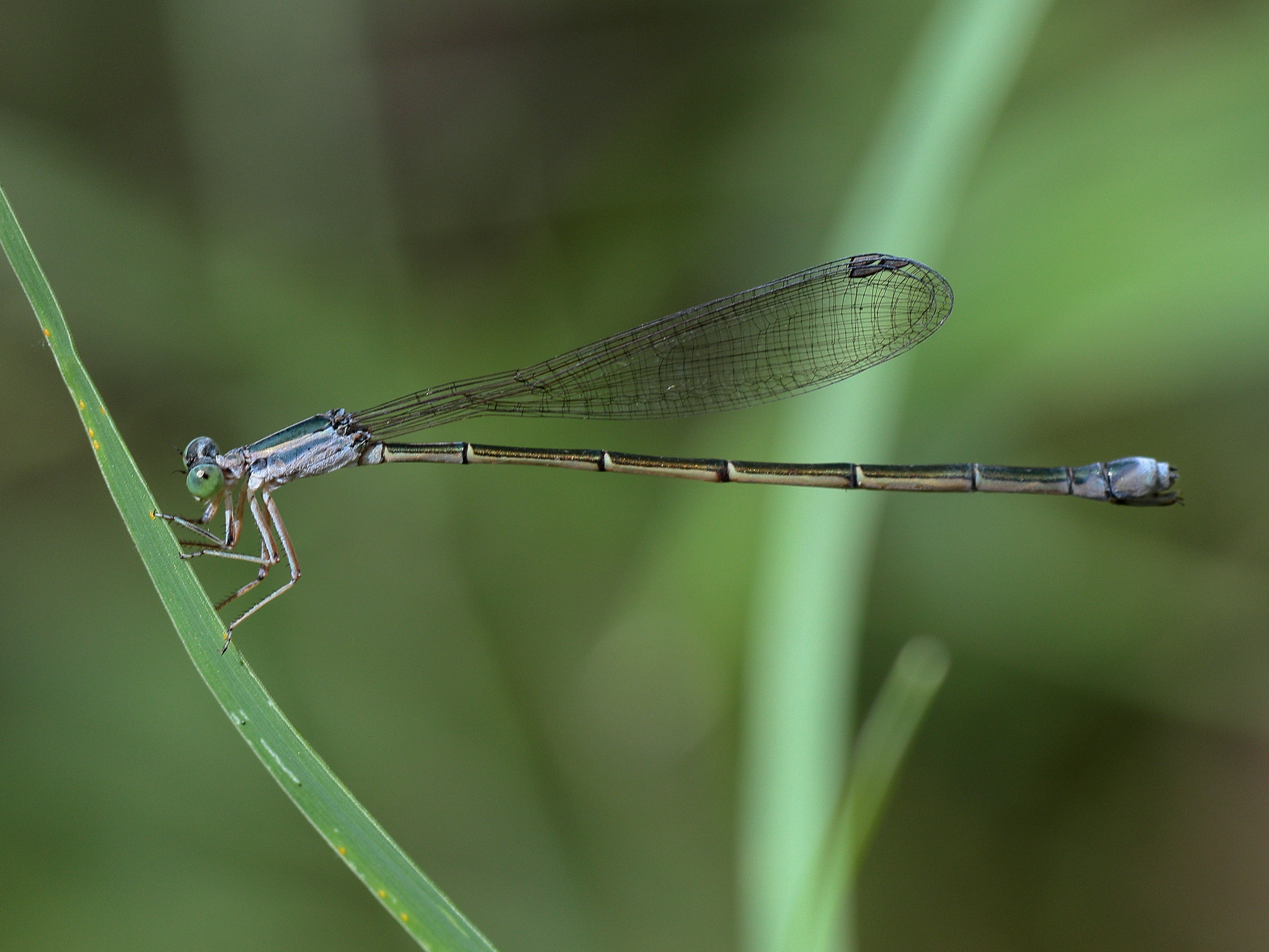
Female left hand side

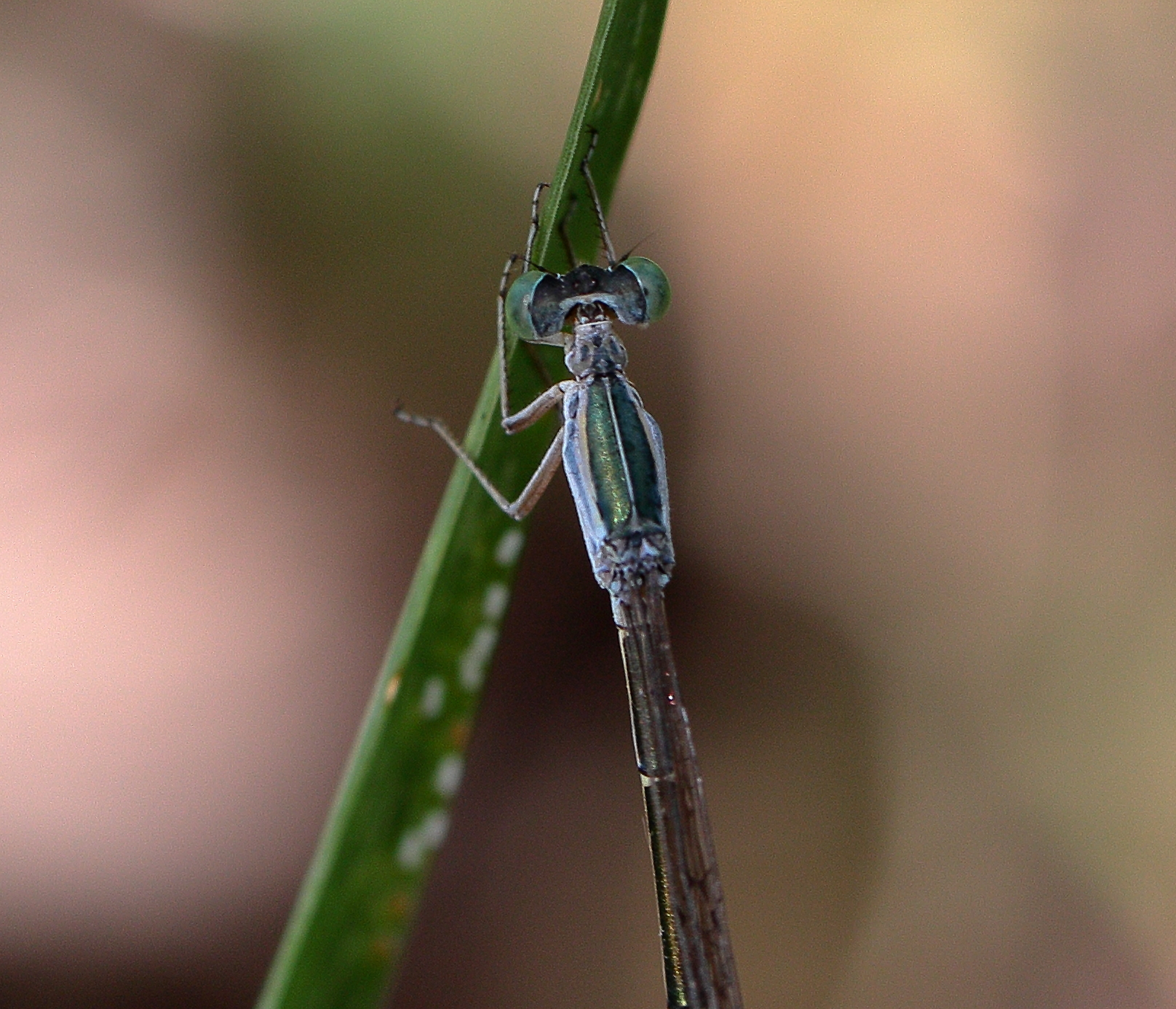
Female from above

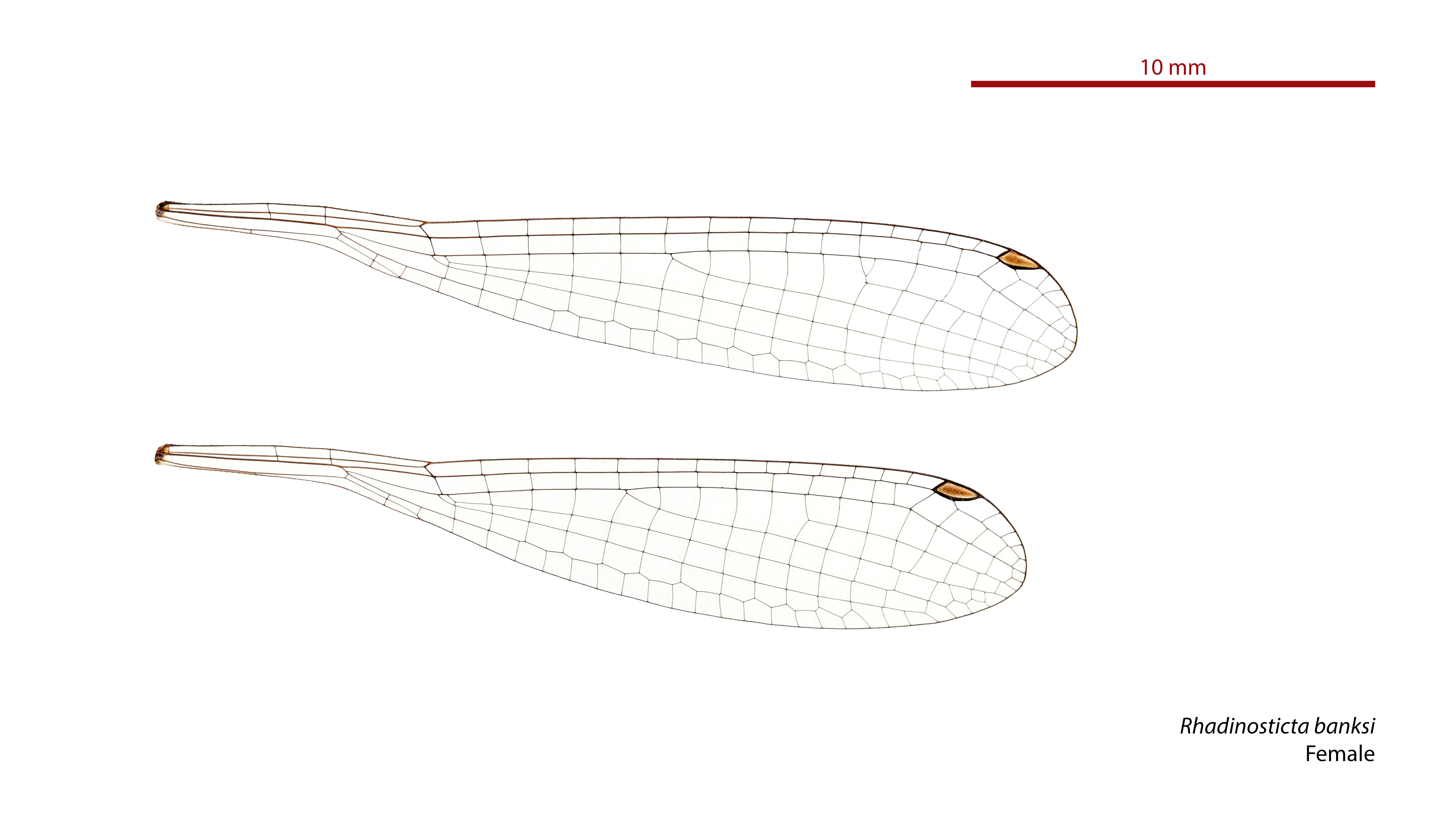
Female wings

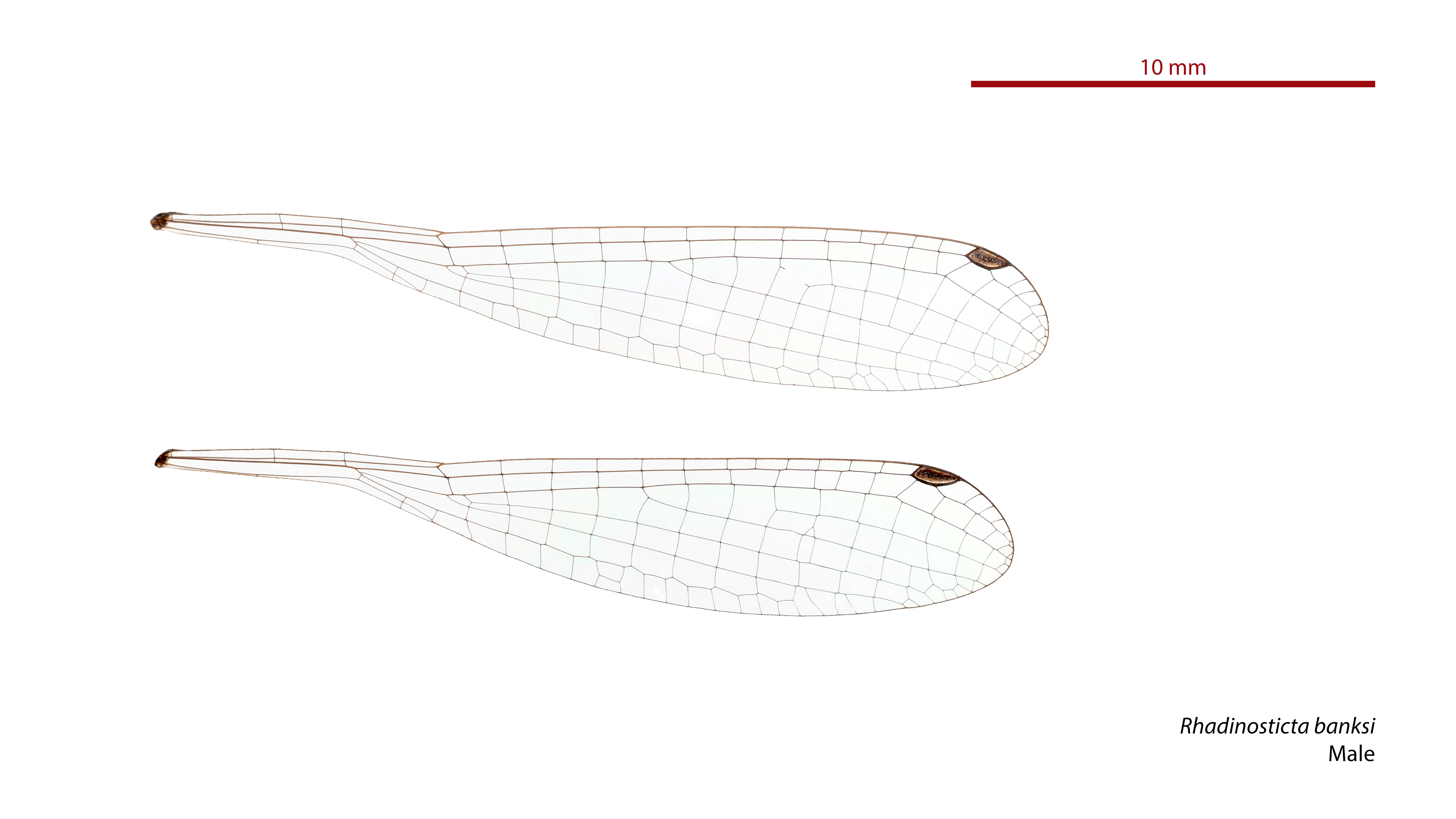
Male wings
