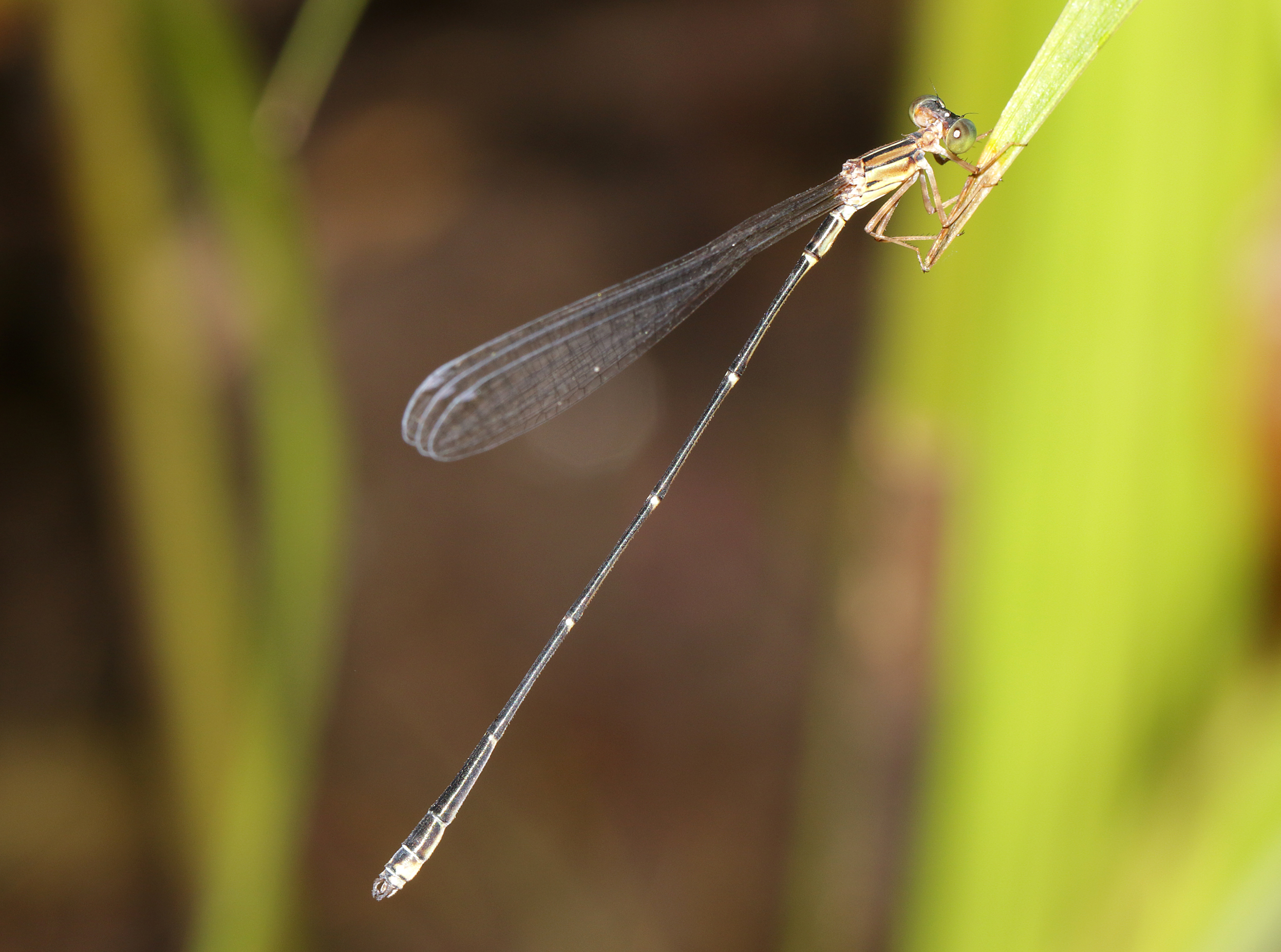
- Slender wiretail Oristicta filicicola, Cairns, Australia

Conservation status
- Least Concern (IUCN 3.1)

Scientific classification
- Kingdom: Animalia
- Phylum: Arthropoda
- Clade: Pancrustacea
- Class: Insecta
- Order: Odonata
- Suborder: Zygoptera
- Family: Isostictidae
- Genus: Oristicta
- Species: O. filicicola

Binomial name
- Oristicta filicicola Tillyard, 1913

Synonyms
- Phasmosticta interposita Lieftinck, 1951

= Oristicta filicicola =

Slender wiretail

Species of damselfly

Oristicta filicicola is a species of damselfly belonging to the family Isostictidae. Until 2017 it was the only species of the genus Oristicta. Commonly known as a slender wiretail, it is a slender and dull-coloured damselfly of medium-size. It is endemic to north-eastern Australia, where it inhabits streams in rainforests.

== Description ==
=== Body ===
Oristicta filicicola has olive-green eyes widely spaced on a small head. The synthorax is pale on the lower surface, graduating to a light green on the sides, with dark markings along the sutures. The upper surface is brown, outlined in black on the edges. The dorsal carina (mid-line ridge) is white on a dark background. The abdomen is long and slender, with a steel-like metallic-black on the upper surface, sharply cut off to cream ventral surfaces. At each segment join the paler colour sweeps up forming a narrow ring. On segments 9 and 10, the pale coloration sweeps up towards the rear, to form a dark wedge-shaped pattern on both segments. From a sample of twenty-six specimens held in the Commonwealth Scientific and Industrial Research Organisation, the average length from head to tail tip was 45 mm. The superior anal appendages of the male are club shaped and curve inwards. The inferior appendages are about half as long. In the female, the ovipositor is black and there are two small diverging filaments forming a "v" shape. The appendages are short and pointed.

=== Wings ===
The wings are transparent with dark veins and the average wing span is 50mm. The pterostigma near the wing apex are dark grey outlined with black, measuring just more than half the length of the cell above which they are positioned. The forewings and hindwings are similar in layout. Postnodal crossveins number 12–14 in the forewing and 11–13 in the hindwing. Diagnostic features which distinguish Oristicta from other genera include the crossvein (Ac) being located between (Ax1) and (Ax2) but closer to (Ax1), and the median sector diverging after the nodal crossvein.

== Etymology ==
The genus name Oristicta is derived from the Greek ὄρος (oros, "mountain") and στικτός (stiktos, "spotted" or "marked"). The suffix -sticta is commonly used in names of taxa within the subfamily Isostictinae. The type species was discovered near the summit of Mount Cook, near Cooktown, Queensland.

The species name filicicola is derived from the Latin filix ("fern") and incola ("dweller" or "inhabitant"), referring to its fern-rich habitat.

== Gallery ==
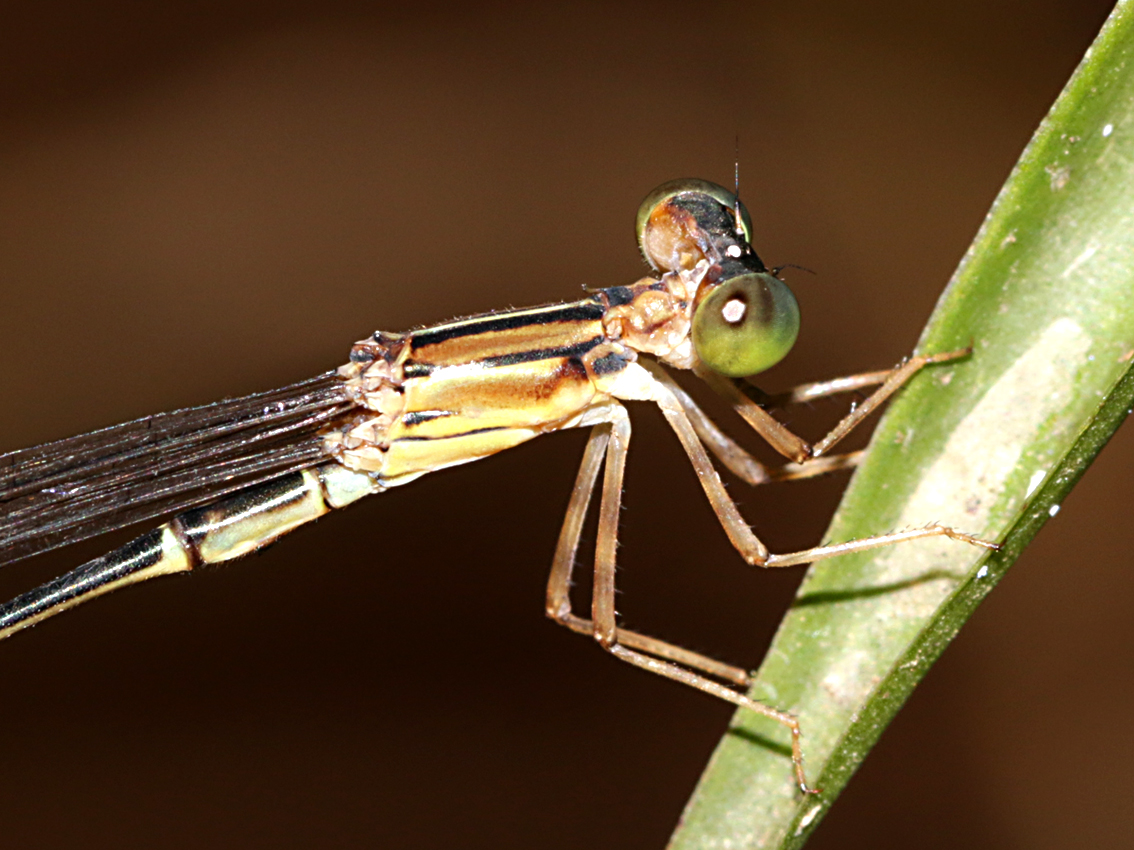
Oristicta filicicola detail of head and synthorax, Cairns

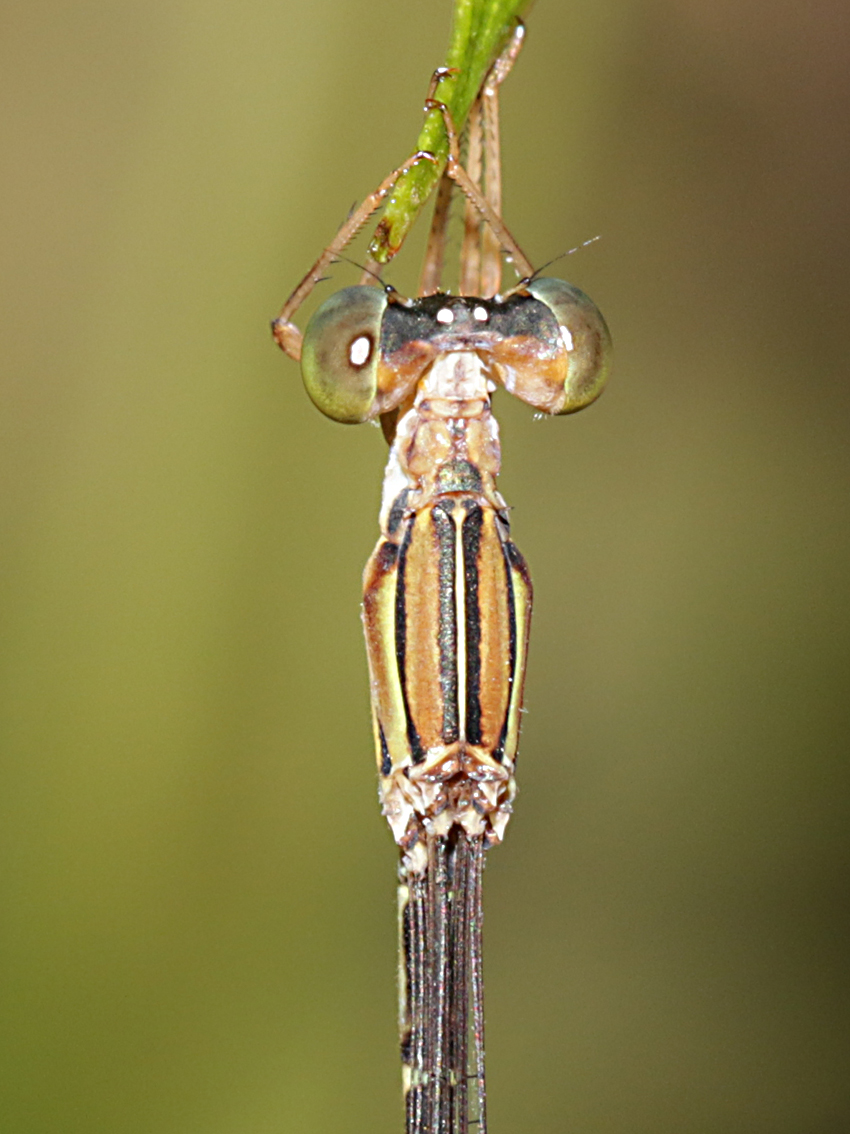
Dorsal view of head and synthorax

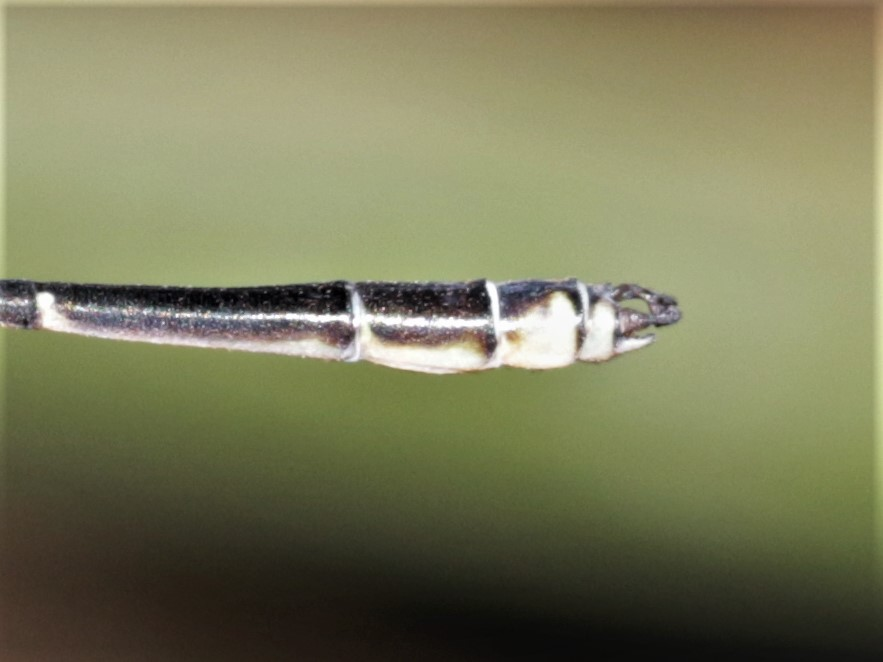
The superior (upper) appendages are longer than the inferior (lower) appendages in the Slender wiretail. This is a male.

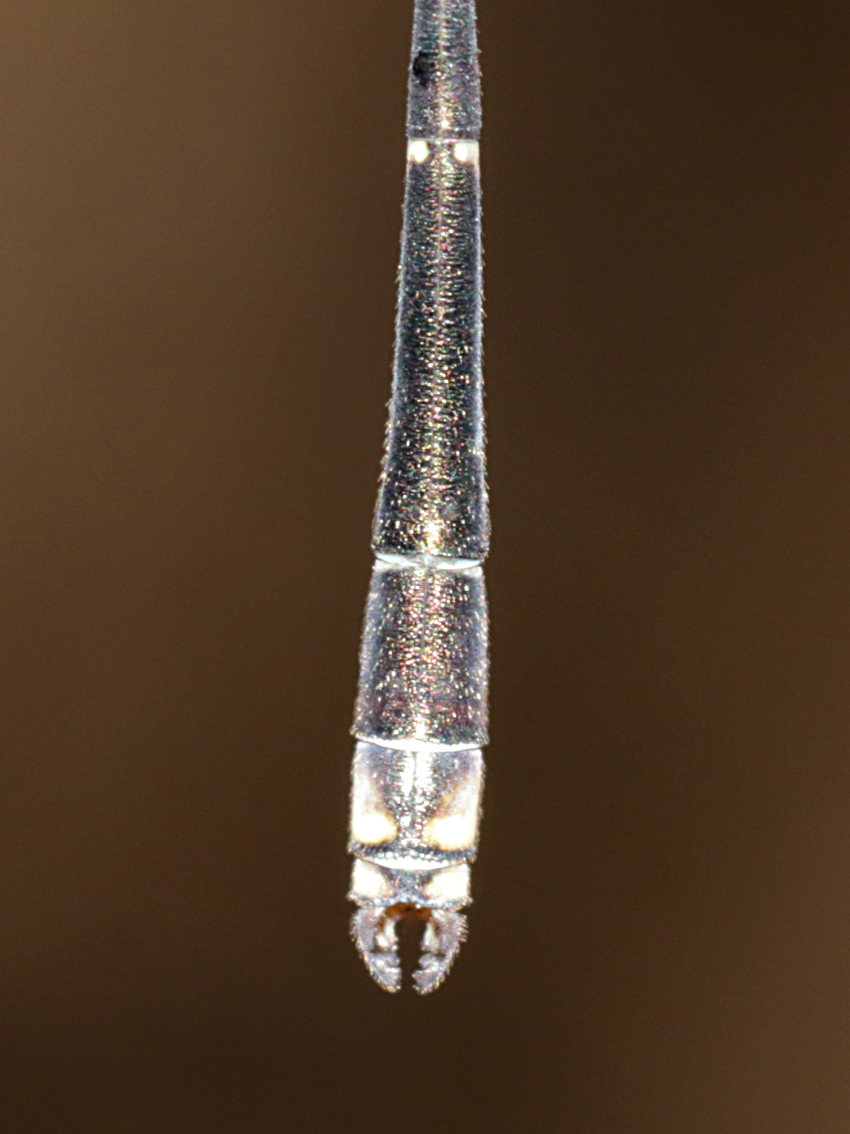
Dorsal view of male abdomen end and appendages

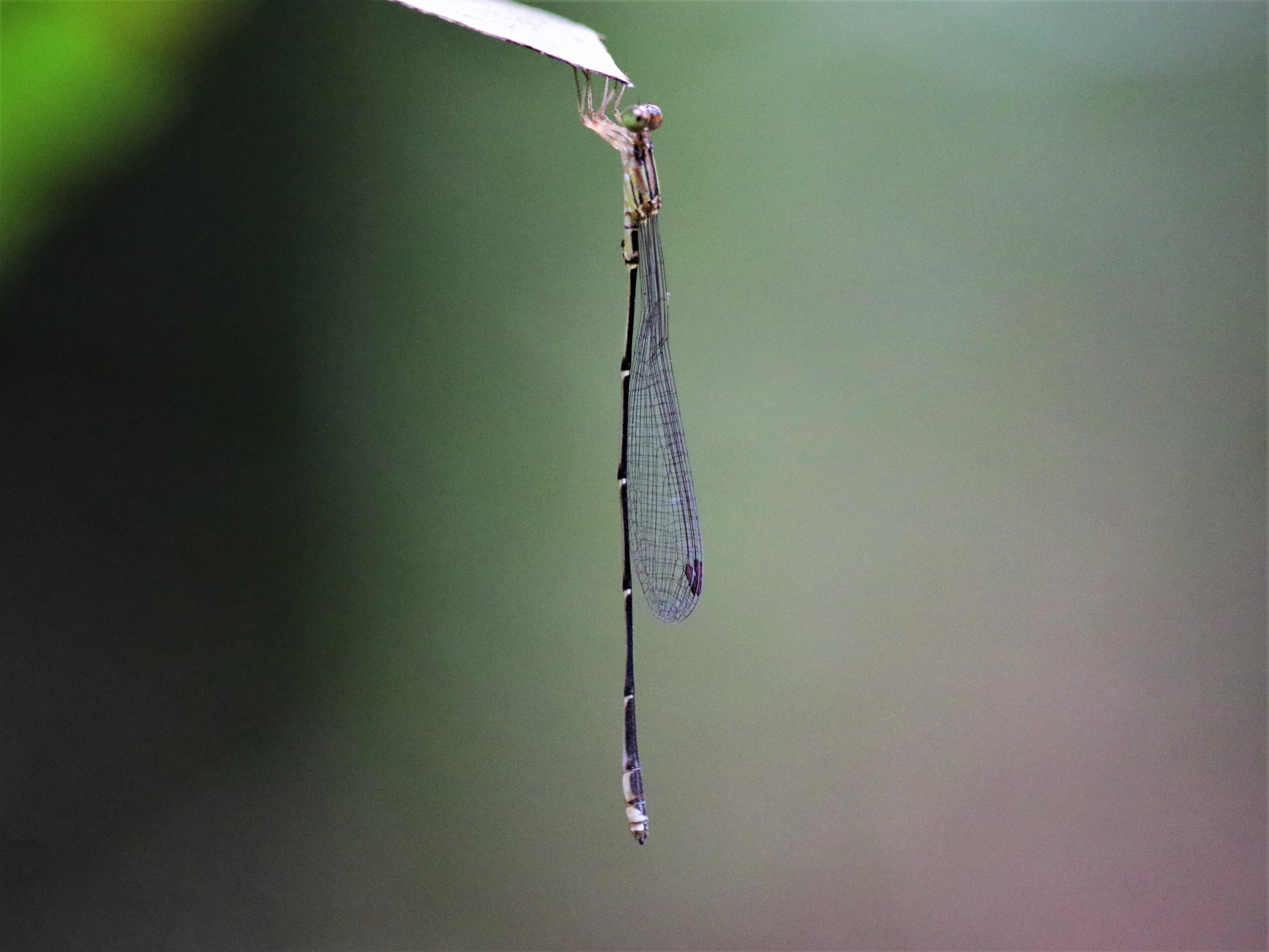
Profile view of a male

Illustration of Oristicta wing veins

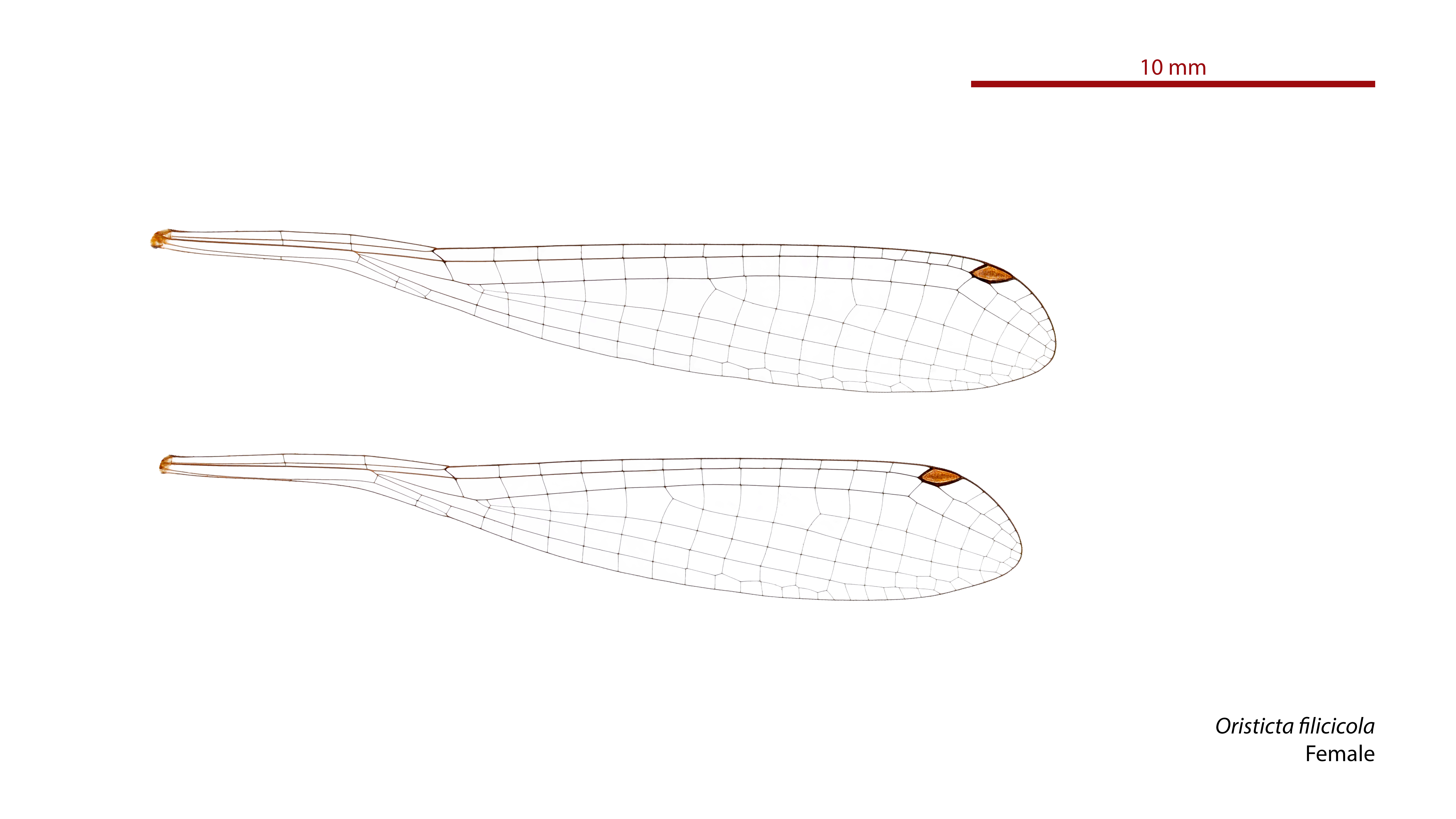
Photo of female wings

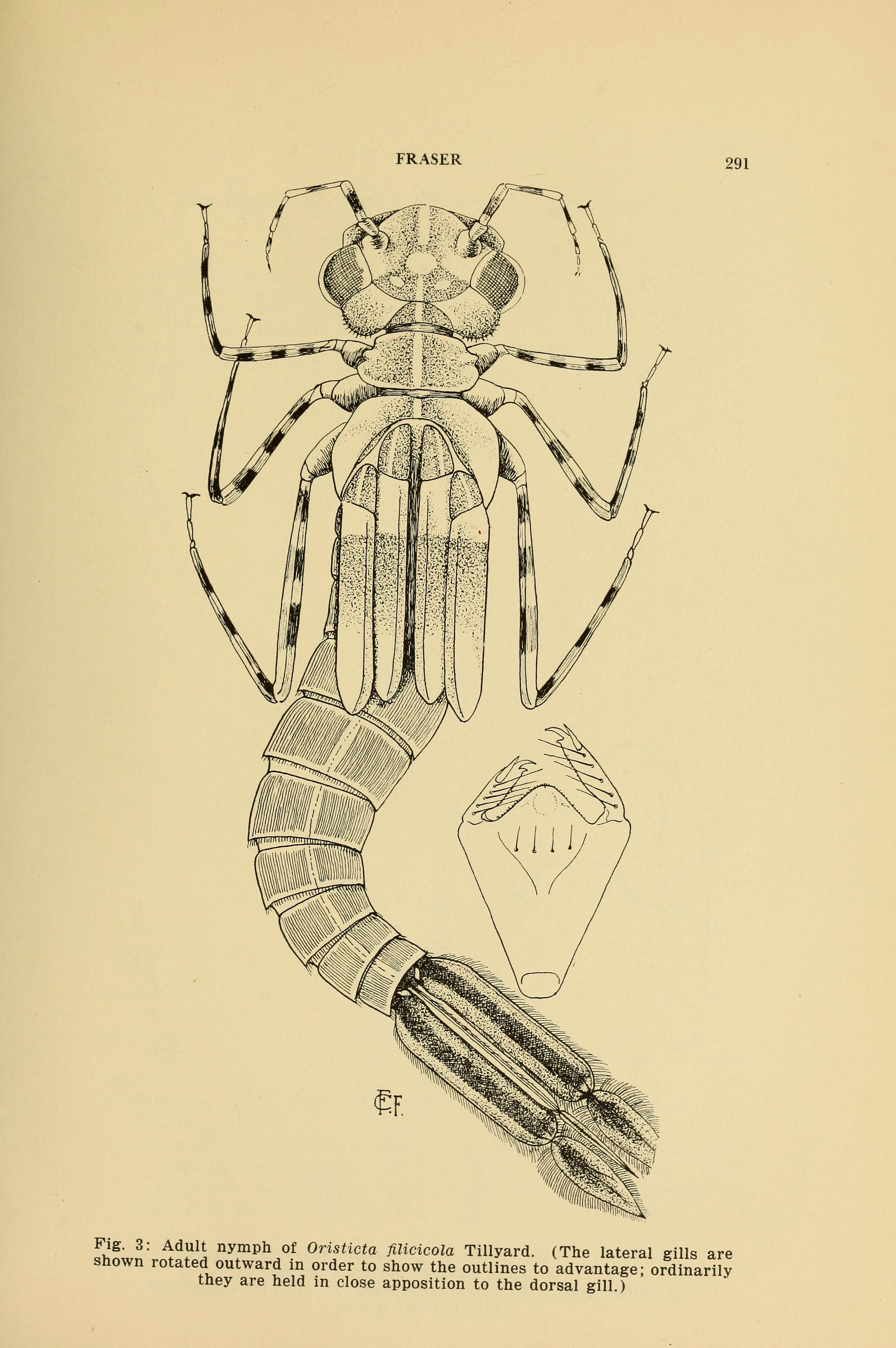
Adult nymph of Oristicta filicicola
