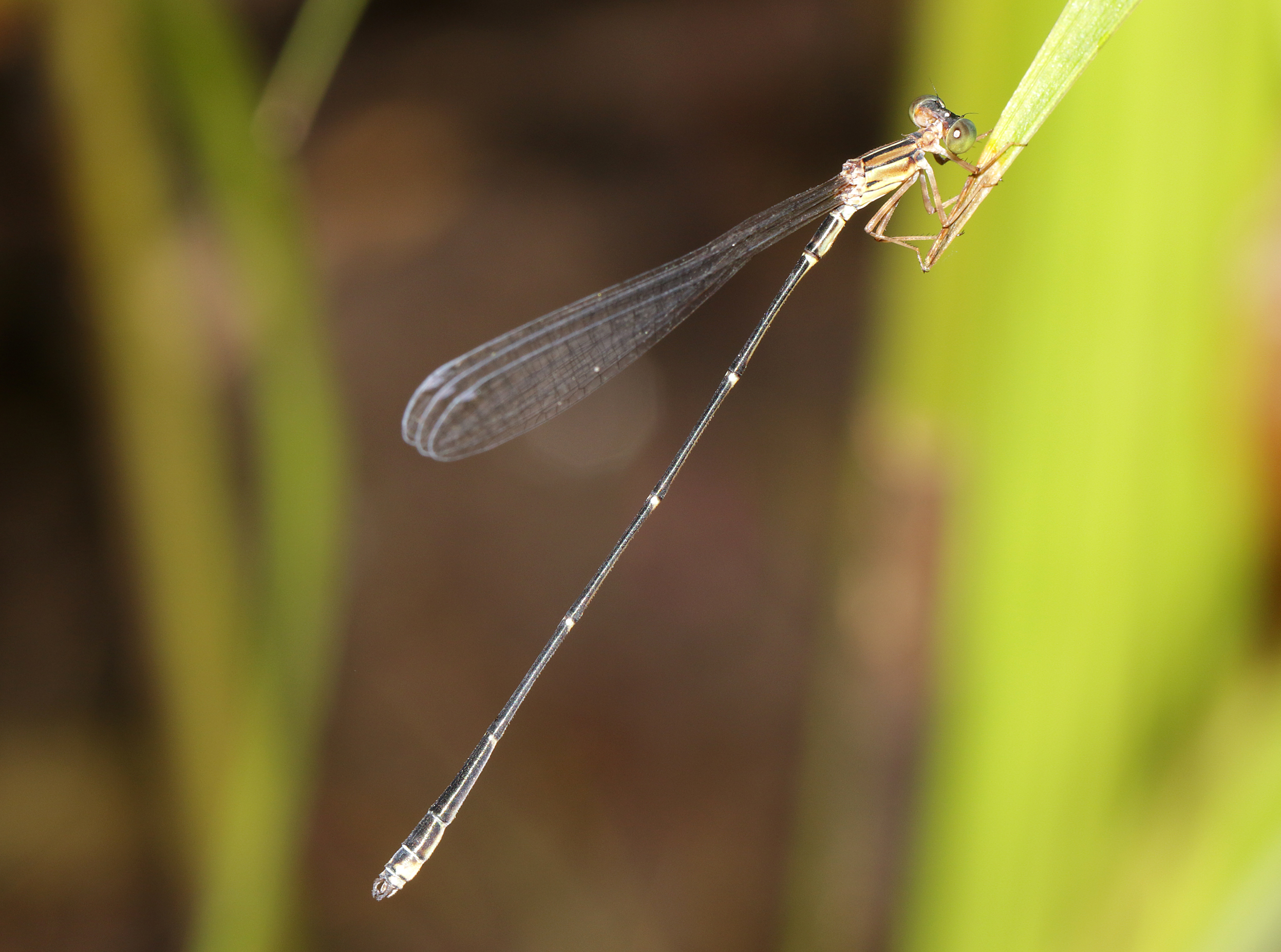
- Oristicta filicicola

Scientific classification
- Kingdom: Animalia
- Phylum: Arthropoda
- Clade: Pancrustacea
- Class: Insecta
- Order: Odonata
- Suborder: Zygoptera
- Superfamily: Coenagrionoidea
- Family: Isostictidae; Fraser, 1955

= Isostictidae =

Family of damselflies

Isostictidae is a family of damselflies in the superfamily Coenagrionoidea. The family comprises more than 40 species in 12 genera and is largely restricted to Australia, New Guinea, New Caledonia and neighbouring islands.

Members of the family are slender damselflies that typically inhabit streams and other freshwater habitats. Adults generally lack the bright colours found in many other damselfly families, while the aquatic larvae possess distinctive constricted caudal gills.

Although historically treated as a subfamily of Protoneuridae, Isostictidae is now recognised as a distinct family and represents an early-diverging lineage within Coenagrionoidea.

== Diagnosis ==
- Adult: The adults have a length of 15–40 mm. They have two antenodal crossveins, most postnodal crossveins aligned with crossveins behind them, quadrilateral cell almost rectangular, no supplementary intercalary longitudinal veins, and an anal vein fused with wing margin. Their antennae are seven-segmented.
- Larva: Larvae have a labial mask, with short flat palps and narrow palpal setae. Premental setae are variable, median lobe is shallowly cleft; caudal gills are saccular to triquetral and strongly nodate.

== Ecology ==
Adults of Isostictidae have many common names, for example: narrow-wings, pinflies, pins, pondsitters, and wiretails.

- Instream habitat: Isostictid damselfly nymphs occur in streams, rivers, and riverine pools. The adults occur along these habitats. The nymphs are found on submerged vegetation, willow roots, leaf packs and detritus.
- Feeding ecology: Nymphs and adults are predators.
- Habits: Nymphs of these damselflies are clingers. Adults like to rest on many different plants.
- Life history: Some females of some species lay their eggs in dry twigs over lentic freshwater. Other female species may lay their eggs on the bare rocks of waterfalls.

== Taxonomic history ==
The family takes its name from the genus Isosticta, established by Selys in 1885 within his Legion Protonevra. At that time, Isosticta was treated as one of several groups within a broad assemblage of damselflies that also included genera now placed in Protoneuridae and Platycnemididae.

Fraser established the subfamily Isostictinae in 1955, recognising a distinctive Australasian lineage within the then broadly defined Protoneuridae. In his subsequent reclassification of the Odonata, Fraser (1957) treated Isostictinae as one of four subfamilies of Protoneuridae, comprising genera from Australia, New Guinea, New Caledonia and neighbouring islands.

More recent studies have shown that the group represents a distinct evolutionary lineage. Dijkstra and colleagues (2013, 2014) recognised Isostictidae as a separate family, a placement supported by subsequent phylogenomic studies.

== Genera ==
The following genera are currently placed in Isostictidae:

- Austrosticta Tillyard, 1908
- Cnemisticta Donnelly, 1993
- Eurysticta Watson, 1969
- Isosticta Selys, 1885
- Labidiosticta Watson, 1991
- Lithosticta Watson, 1991
- Neosticta Tillyard, 1913
- Oristicta Tillyard, 1913
- Rhadinosticta Watson, 1991
- Selysioneura Förster, 1900
- Tanymecosticta Lieftinck, 1935
- Titanosticta Donnelly, 1993

== Etymology ==
The family name Isostictidae is derived from the type genus Isosticta, with the standard zoological suffix -idae used for animal families.

The genus name Isosticta is derived from the Greek ἴσος (isos, "equal") and στικτός (stiktos, "spotted" or "marked"), possibly referring to the similar pterostigma. The suffix -sticta is also common in names associated with the Protonerva group of subgenera.

== See also ==
- List of damselflies of the world (Isostictidae)
- List of Odonata species of Australia
