= Neosticta fraseri =

Tropical pinfly

Conservation status
- Least Concern (IUCN 3.1)

Scientific classification
- Kingdom: Animalia
- Phylum: Arthropoda
- Clade: Pancrustacea
- Class: Insecta
- Order: Odonata
- Suborder: Zygoptera
- Family: Isostictidae
- Genus: Neosticta
- Species: N. fraseri

Binomial name
- Neosticta fraseri Watson, 1991

Species of damselfly

Neosticta fraseri is a species of damselfly in the family Isostictidae, commonly known as a tropical pinfly. It can be found in tropical north-eastern Queensland, Australia, where it inhabits streams.

Neosticta fraseri is a slender, medium-sized damselfly, dull brown to black in colour with pale markings. Adults have a slight pruinescence

This damselfly is named after F.C. Fraser, the English entomologist who illustrated this species in 1960, when it was then named Neosticta silvarum.

== Etymology ==
The genus name Neosticta is derived from the Greek νέος (neos, "new") and στικτός (stiktos, "spotted" or "marked"). The suffix -sticta is commonly used in names of taxa within the subfamily Isostictinae.

In 1991, Tony Watson named this species fraseri, an eponym honouring the English entomologist and dragonfly specialist Frederic Charles Fraser (1880–1963), who had illustrated the species in 1960.

== Gallery ==
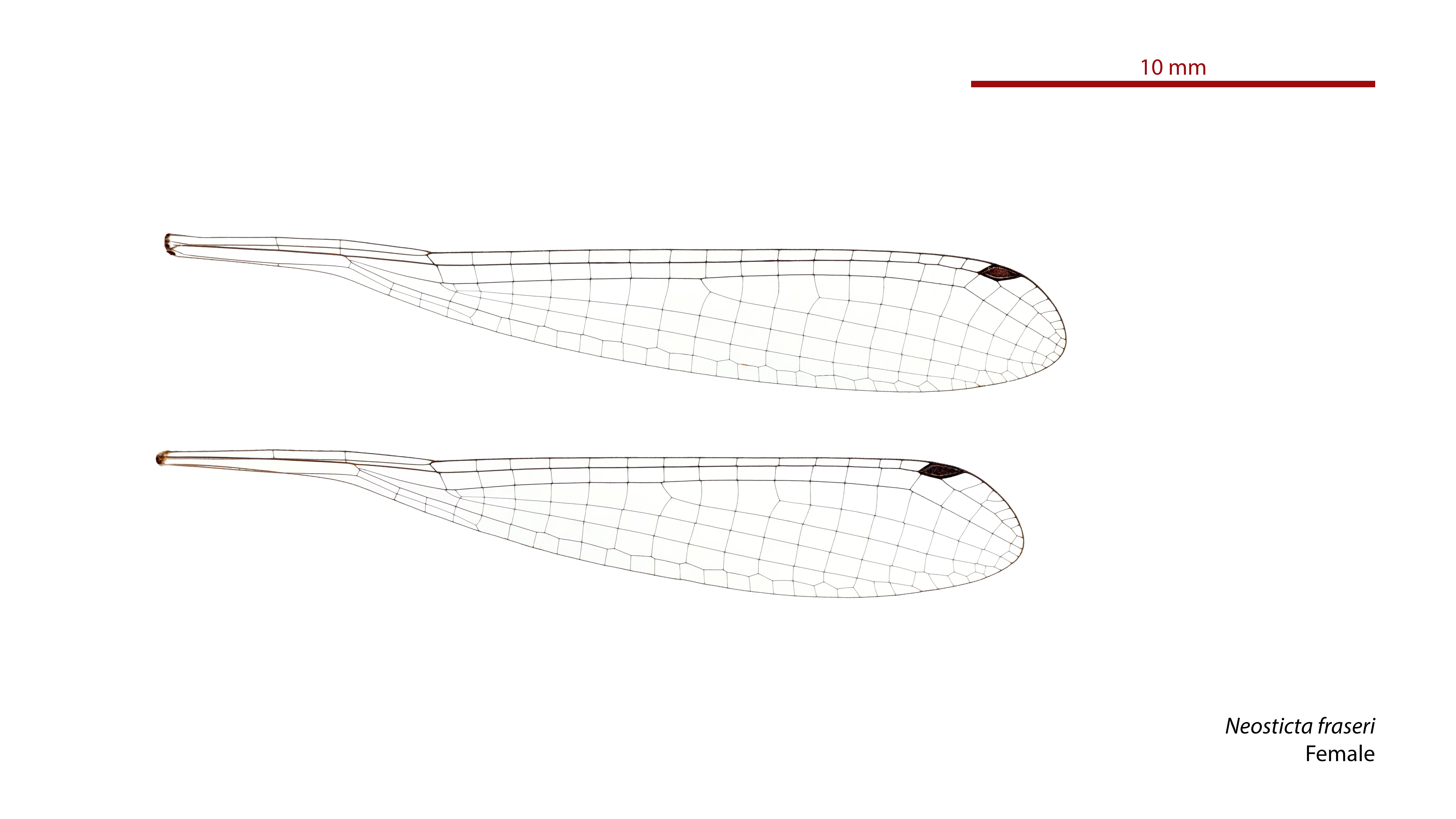
Female wings

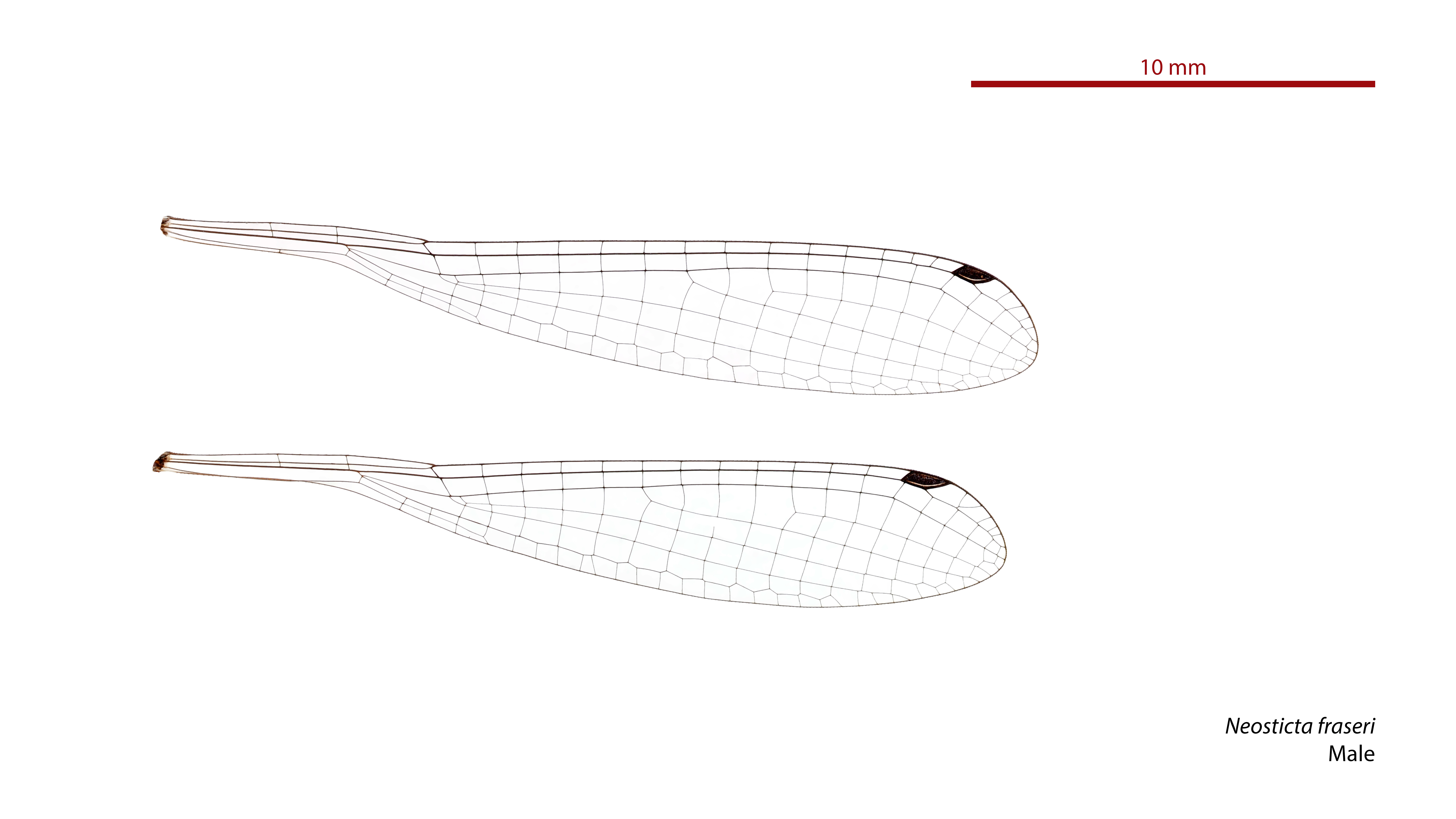
Male wings

== See also ==
- List of Odonata species of Australia
