= Neosticta =

Scientific classification
- Kingdom: Animalia
- Phylum: Arthropoda
- Clade: Pancrustacea
- Class: Insecta
- Order: Odonata
- Suborder: Zygoptera
- Family: Isostictidae
- Genus: Neosticta; Tillyard, 1913

Genus of damselflies

Neosticta is a genus of damselflies belonging to the family Isostictidae. It is endemic to eastern Australia. Species of Neosticta are medium-sized damselflies, with a dull brown or black colouring and pale markings.

== Species ==
The genus Neosticta includes the following species:

- Neosticta canescens Tillyard, 1913
- Neosticta fraseri Watson, 1991
- Neosticta silvarum Sjöstedt, 1917

== Etymology ==
The genus name Neosticta is derived from the Greek νέος (neos, "new") and στικτός (stiktos, "spotted" or "marked"). The suffix -sticta is commonly used in names of taxa within the subfamily Isostictinae.
