= Neosticta canescens =

Southern pinfly

Conservation status
- Least Concern (IUCN 3.1)

Scientific classification
- Kingdom: Animalia
- Phylum: Arthropoda
- Clade: Pancrustacea
- Class: Insecta
- Order: Odonata
- Suborder: Zygoptera
- Family: Isostictidae
- Genus: Neosticta
- Species: N. canescens

Binomial name
- Neosticta canescens Tillyard, 1913

Species of damselfly

Neosticta canescens is a species of damselfly in the family Isostictidae, commonly known as a southern pinfly. It can be found in eastern Australia, where it inhabits streams.

Neosticta canescens is a medium-sized damselfly, dull brown to black in colour with pale markings.

== Etymology ==
The genus name Neosticta is derived from the Greek νέος (neos, "new") and στικτός (stiktos, "spotted" or "marked"). The suffix -sticta is commonly used in names of taxa within the subfamily Isostictinae.

The species name canescens is derived from the Latin canesco ("to become white" or "hoary"), referring to the pruinescence of older individuals.

== Gallery ==
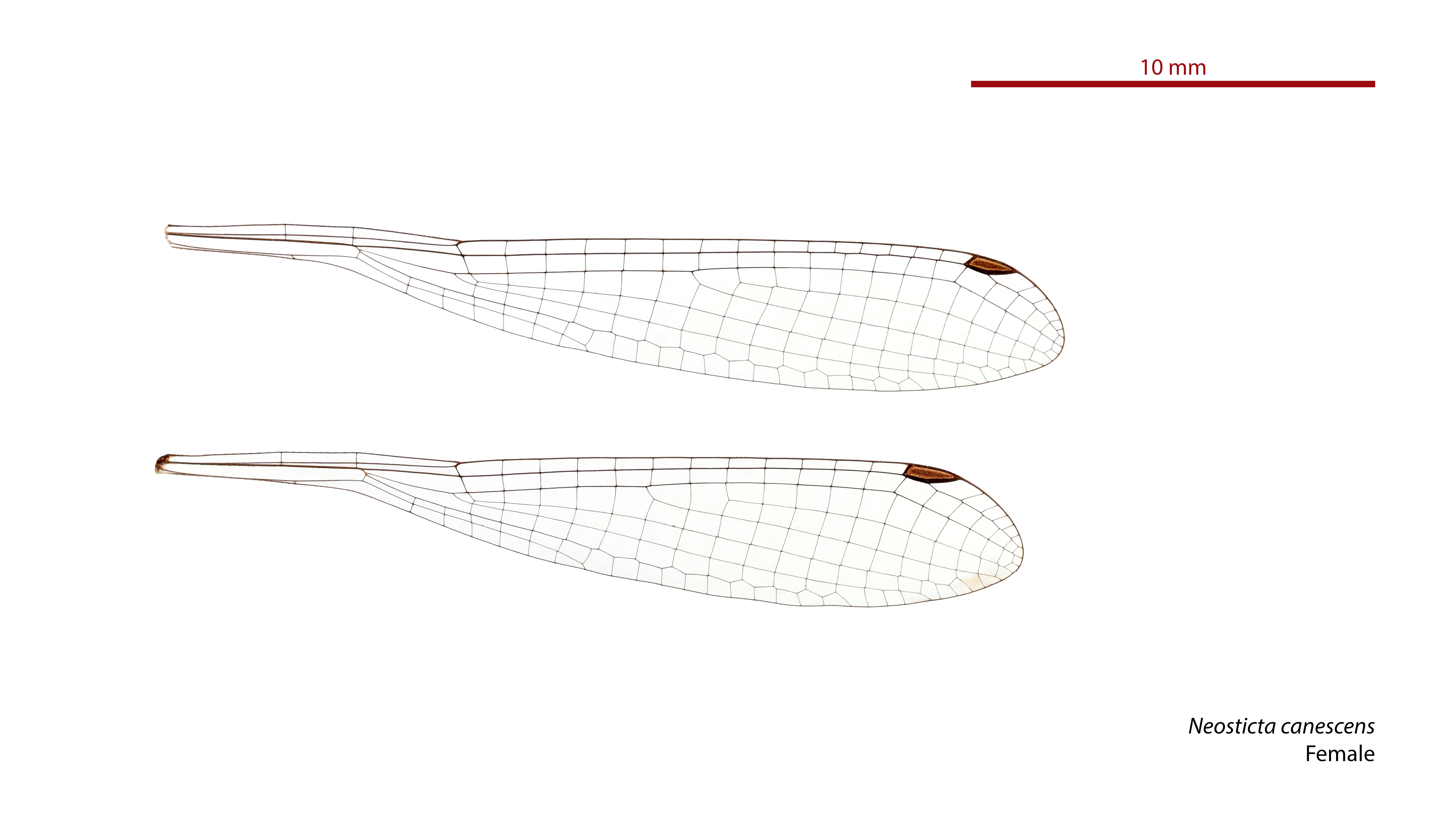
Female wings

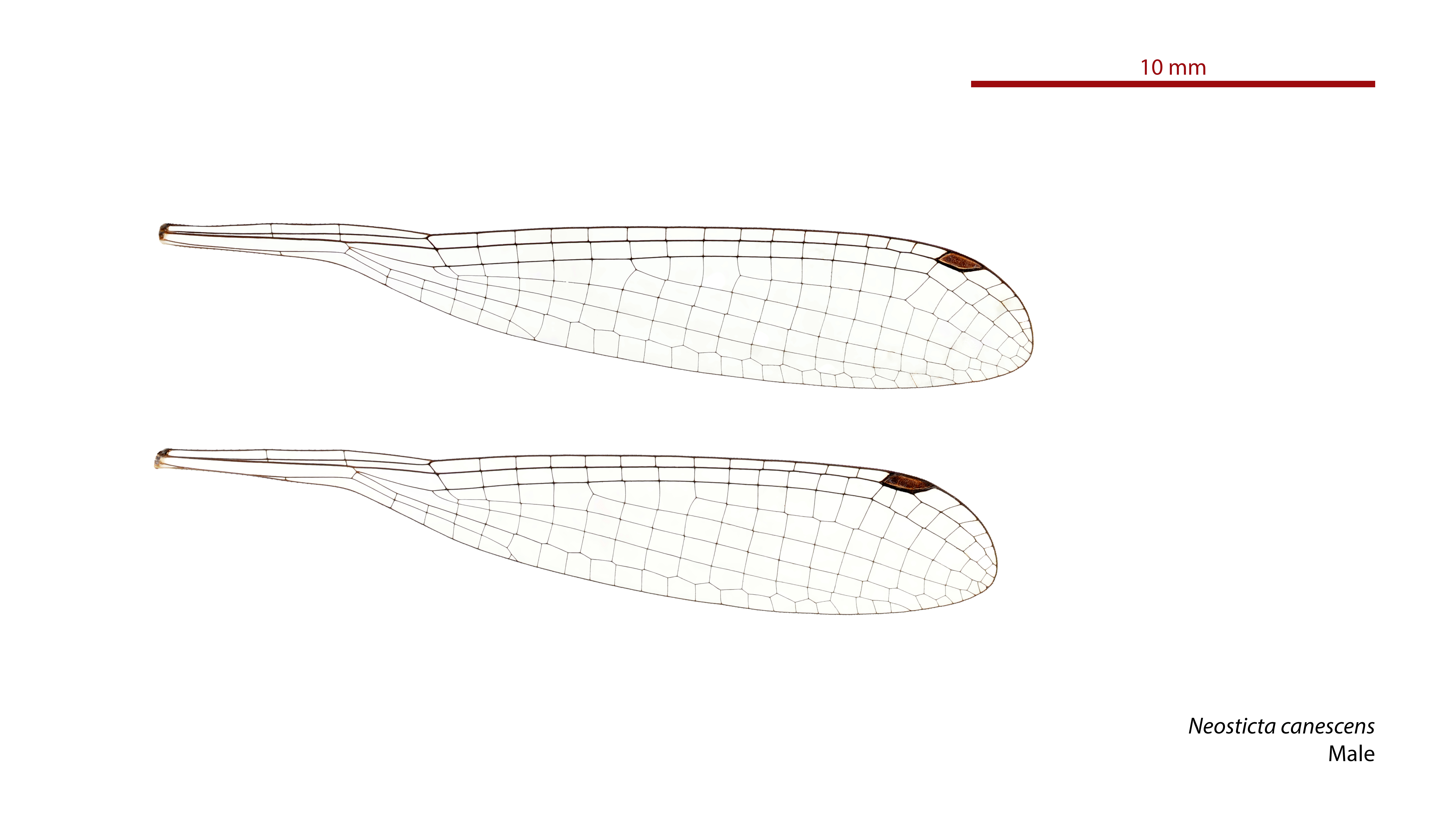
Male wings

== See also ==
- List of Odonata species of Australia
