= Neosticta silvarum =

Forest pinfly

Conservation status
- Data Deficient (IUCN 3.1)

Scientific classification
- Kingdom: Animalia
- Phylum: Arthropoda
- Clade: Pancrustacea
- Class: Insecta
- Order: Odonata
- Suborder: Zygoptera
- Family: Isostictidae
- Genus: Neosticta
- Species: N. silvarum

Binomial name
- Neosticta silvarum (Sjöstedt, 1917)

Synonyms
- Amphisticta silvarum Sjöstedt, 1917

Species of damselfly

Neosticta silvarum is a species of damselfly in the family Isostictidae, commonly known as a forest pinfly. It is endemic to tropical north-eastern Queensland, Australia, where it inhabits streams in rainforest.

Neosticta silvarum is a slender, medium-sized damselfly, dull brown to black in colour with pale markings.

== Etymology ==
The genus name Neosticta is derived from the Greek νέος (neos, "new") and στικτός (stiktos, "spotted" or "marked"). The suffix -sticta is commonly used in names of taxa within the subfamily Isostictinae.

The species name silvarum is derived from the Latin silva ("wood", "forest"), likely referring to the rainforest habitat of this species.

== Gallery ==
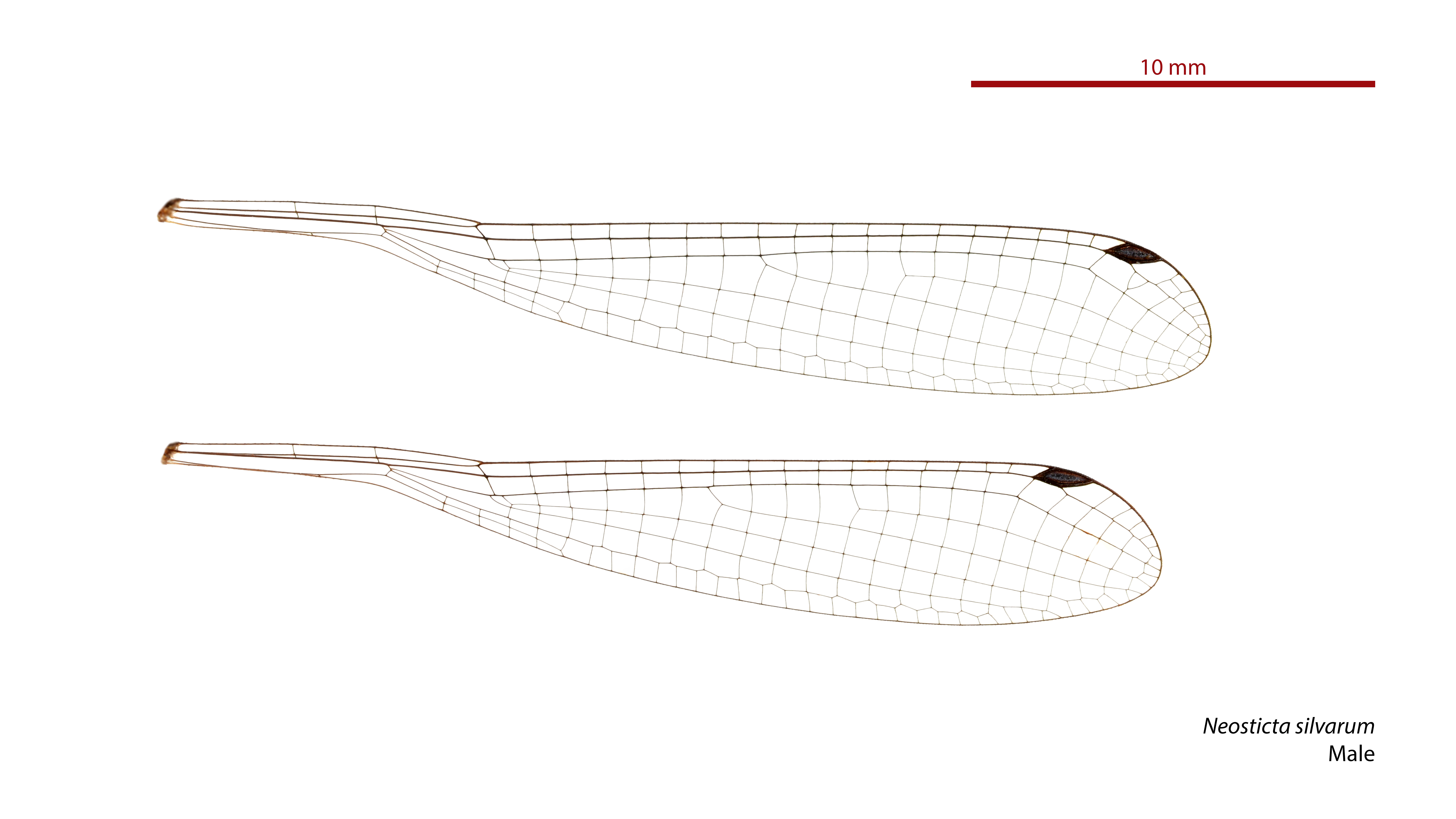
Male wings

== See also ==
- List of Odonata species of Australia
