= Bissetia steniellus =

Scientific classification
- Domain: Eukaryota
- Kingdom: Animalia
- Phylum: Arthropoda
- Class: Insecta
- Order: Lepidoptera
- Family: Crambidae
- Subfamily: Crambinae
- Tribe: Haimbachiini
- Genus: Bissetia
- Species: B. steniellus

Binomial name
- Bissetia steniellus (Hampson, 1899)

Synonyms
- Acigona steniellus Hampson, 1899; Chilo steniellus Hampson, 1899; Chilo griseoradians de Joannis, 1930; Chilo trypetes Bisset, 1939

Species of moth

Bissetia steniellus is a moth in the family Crambidae. It was first described by the British entomologist George Hampson in 1899. It is found in India and Vietnam where it is commonly known as the Gurdaspur borer because the larvae bore their way into and feed on the stems of sugarcane.

== Description ==
The adult Bissetia steniellus has a wingspan of 25 to 45 mm (1.0 to 1.8 in). It is generally drab brown, and there are seven darker brown spots arranged between the veins on the outer margins of the forewings. The larva is creamy-white with four narrow, longitudinal, reddish stripes along the body, and an orange head.

== Distribution ==
B. steniellus is found in India, Pakistan and Vietnam. Its range in India includes the states of Haryana, Punjab, Uttar Pradesh and Rajasthan.

== Life cycle ==
The only known host plant for B. steniellus is the sugarcane. The female moth lays a batch of 100 to 300 eggs on the midrib of a sugarcane leaf. The larvae hatch out after about a week and make their way into the stem by drilling holes just above a node. They excavate galleries inside the stem, feeding voraciously. When the cane dries up and the crown of leaves dies in about ten days, the larvae move to a different cane in the vicinity. They feed for three to four weeks, passing through five instar stages, before pupating inside a stem. The adult moths emerge in six to twelve days. The male/female ratio varies between forty and sixty percent in the different generations. The whole life cycle lasts about five or six weeks, and there may be two or three generations in each year.

== Damage ==
B. steniellus does varying amounts of damage to sugarcane crops, 25% of the crop sometimes being affected, with 75% damage known in severe cases. Affected plants are best destroyed and stubble cleared at the end of the season. The organochloride endrin is effective against the pest but is banned in many countries. The fly Sturmiopsis inferens is a naturally occurring parasitoid and its use as a possible biological pest control agent is being investigated. It has proved possible to rear the fly in the laboratory and release it in sugarcane plantations. In the March to June hot season, the fly mainly targets the sugarcane shoot borer (Chilo infuscatellus) and the pink borer (Sesamia inferens). In the monsoon period, July to October, it shifts to B. steniellus. Finally, between November and January, it targets the gold-fringed rice stemborer (Chilo auricilius).
