= Chilo auricilius =

Scientific classification
- Kingdom: Animalia
- Phylum: Arthropoda
- Clade: Pancrustacea
- Class: Insecta
- Order: Lepidoptera
- Family: Crambidae
- Genus: Chilo
- Species: C. auricilius

Binomial name
- Chilo auricilius Dudgeon, 1905

Synonyms
- Chilo popescugorji Bleszynski, 1963; Chilo auricilia

Species of moth

Chilo auricilius, the gold-fringed rice stemborer or terai borer, is a moth in the family Crambidae. It was described by Gerald C. Dudgeon in 1905. It is found in India, Taiwan, Bhutan and Sri Lanka, as well as on Sulawesi, Borneo, Sangir Island and the Moluccas. The larvae bore into and feed on the stems of various grass family plants including sugarcane, rice and maize.

== Description ==
The forewings of the adult are rather variable, being yellowish or brownish with silvery dots, either scattered or arranged in two transverse bands. The fringe round the margin of the wings is golden yellow. The forewing length is 8 to 13 millimetres (0.3 to 0.5 in) and the width 3 to 4 millimetres (0.12 to 0.16 in). The hindwings are pale brown.

== Host plants ==
The larvae feed on several members of the grass family Poaceae; these include rice (Oryza sativa), sugarcane (Saccharum officinarum), sorghum (Sorghum bicolor) and maize (Zea mays). On young sugarcane, the larvae kill the leaves and cause the shoots to die. In older cane there may be no noticeable symptoms until the leaf sheaths are stripped off, when the gallery entrances become apparent. On rice, the symptoms are similar to those caused by other stem borers, with death of the central tissue and failure of the flowerhead to develop properly, with the emerging panicles whitish and empty.

== Control ==
A naturally occurring parasitoid fly, Sturmiopsis inferens, has been used to control this stem borer. It can be raised in the laboratory and released where needed. It has been found that the fly is active for most of the year; from March to June it mainly targets the sugarcane shoot borer (Chilo infuscatellus) and the pink borer (Sesamia inferens). Subsequently, from July to October, it targets the Gurdaspur borer (Bissetia steniellus), and between November and January, it mainly attacks the gold-fringed rice stemborer.
