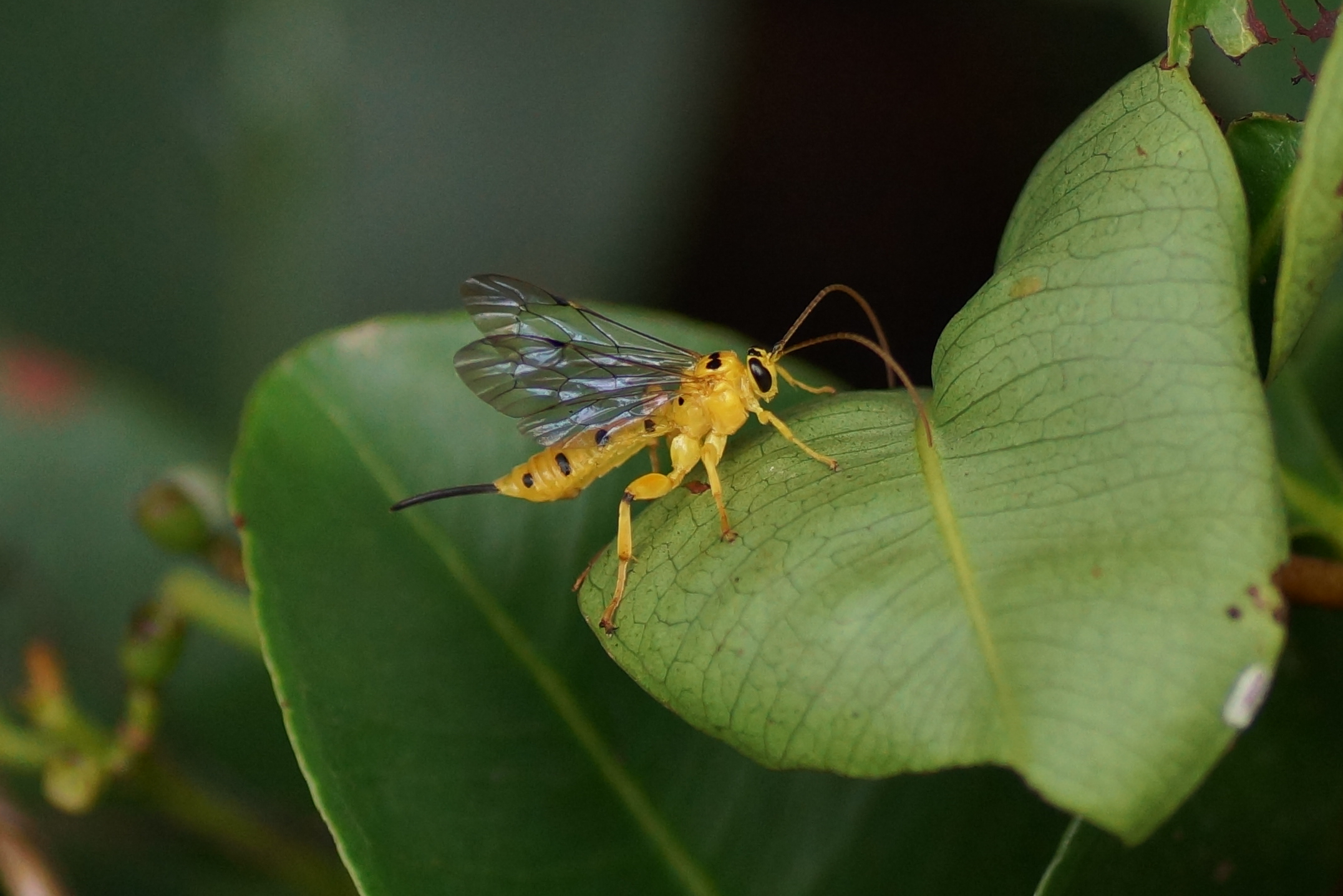

Scientific classification
- Kingdom: Animalia
- Phylum: Arthropoda
- Clade: Pancrustacea
- Class: Insecta
- Order: Hymenoptera
- Family: Ichneumonidae
- Genus: Xanthopimpla
- Species: X. punctata

Binomial name
- Xanthopimpla punctata (Fabricius, 1781)

= Xanthopimpla punctata =

Species of wasp

Xanthopimpla punctata, also known as the yellow ichneumon wasp, is a brightly yellow-colored ichneumonid wasp of subfamily Pimplinae.

Xanthopimpla species are pupal parasitoids of lepidopterous stem boring agricultural pests of cereals, sugar cane, and other crops. X. punctata has also been recorded to parasitise pests of banana plants.

== Description ==
X. punctata displays a lemon-yellow colouration and a black ocellar area, with black spots over various areas of its body: 3 black spots across its mesoscutum, black around the bases of its hind tibiae, and a pair of black spots on each tergite. Females are usually 10-12mm in length and males are significantly smaller.

== Prey ==
Hosts include Lepidopteran cereal stem borer species; such as Haritalodes derogata, Chilo suppressalis, Chilo sacchariphagus, Parnara guttata, and Naranga aenescens. Additionally, X. punctata has been recorded to parasitise Manatha albipes, a banana pest bagworm caterpillar.

== Distribution ==
It has been recorded in many countries in Asia. It has been introduced to North America, though it is considered non invasive.
