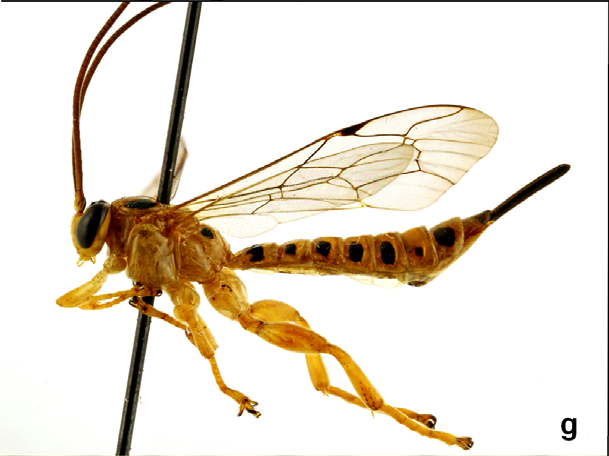

Scientific classification
- Kingdom: Animalia
- Phylum: Arthropoda
- Clade: Pancrustacea
- Class: Insecta
- Order: Hymenoptera
- Family: Ichneumonidae
- Genus: Xanthopimpla
- Species: X. stemmator

Binomial name
- Xanthopimpla stemmator (Thunberg, 1822)

Synonyms
- List: Habropimpla sesamiae Rao, 1953; Xanthopimpla sesamiae (Rao, 1953); Ichneumon stemmator; Xanthopimpla doleschali Krieger, 1915; Xanthopimpla transfuga Krieger, 1915; Xanthopimpla confluens Krieger, 1914; Xanthopimpla facialis Szepligeti, 1908; Xanthopimpla nursei Cameron, 1907; Xanthopimpla bimaculata Cameron, 1906; Xanthopimpla maculifrons Cameron, 1903; Xanthopimpla maculifrons Cameron, 1907; Xanthopimpla thoracalis Krieger, 1899; Pimpla integrata Smith, 1860; Xanthopimpla integrata (Smith, 1860); Xanthopimpla stemmator var. confluens; Xanthopimpla stemmator var. doleschali

= Xanthopimpla stemmator =

Species of parasitoid wasp

Xanthopimpla stemmator is a species of parasitoid wasp first described in 1822. It targets various stem boring moth species as hosts, and are used in agriculture as biological control agents.

This species mostly inhabits Afro-Eurasia, being originally from Asia before being introduced to other areas such as Africa and North America.

== Description ==
Adults possess a bright yellow body with black markings, typical of its genus. The markings are a black ocellar triangle on its head, a pair of black spots on the mesoscutum, with a third median spot near the scutellum, and a pair of black spots on each of its abdominal tergites. Females typically have no spots on the 8th tergite. In some individuals, the spots on the 6th tergite can be smaller or missing entirely.

== Agricultural importation ==
Due to its wide host range of stem borers, X. stemmator has been imported to many African countries such as Mozambique, South Africa, and Kenya in order to control populations of cereal boring pest species such as those in the genus Chilo.

Different parasitoids tend to specialise on hosts at specific life stages, with X. stemmator being a pupal parasitoid. Because of this, it is able to be used in pest control efforts without displacing native parasitoids.
