= Bissetia =

Bissetia may refer to:

- Bissetia (plant), a moss genus in the family Neckeraceae
- Bissetia (moth), a moth genus in the family Crambidae
