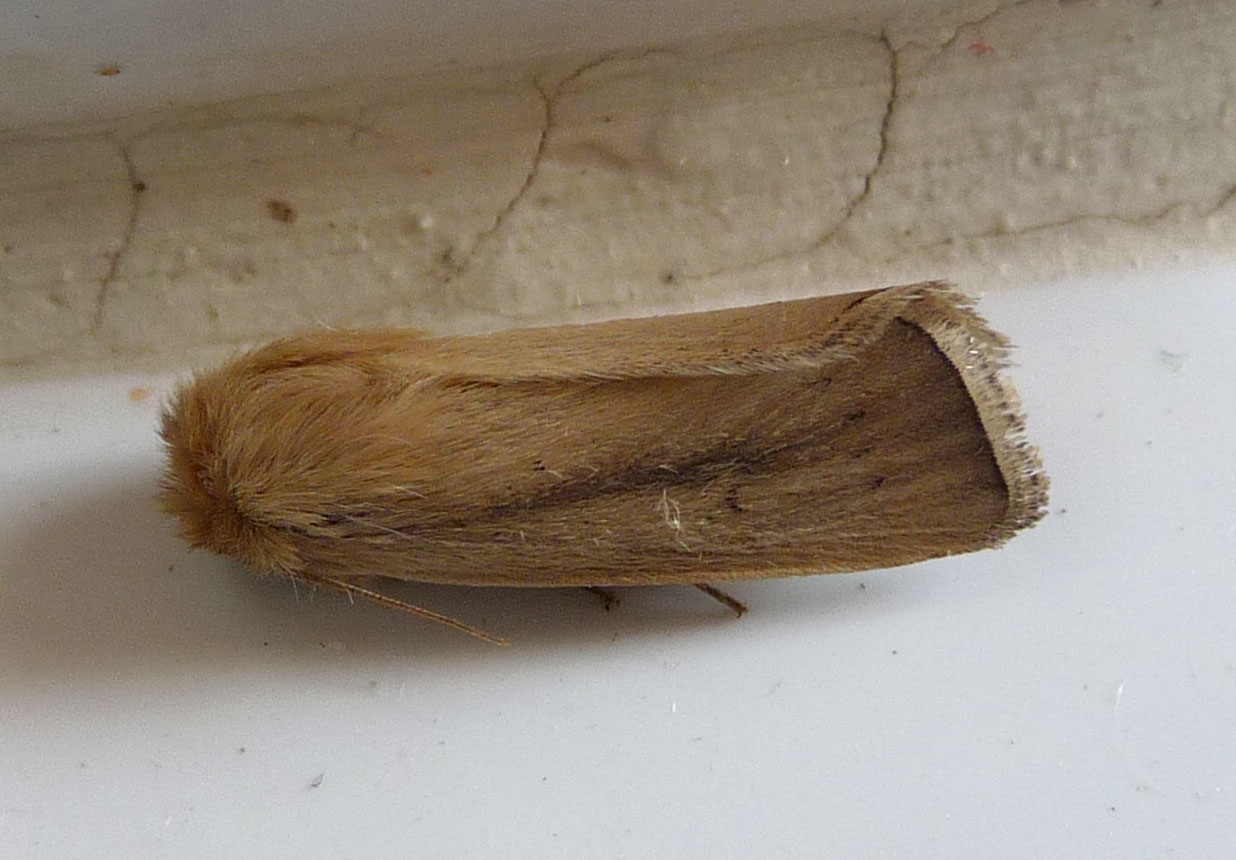

Scientific classification
- Kingdom: Animalia
- Phylum: Arthropoda
- Clade: Pancrustacea
- Class: Insecta
- Order: Lepidoptera
- Superfamily: Noctuoidea
- Family: Noctuidae
- Genus: Sesamia
- Species: S. nonagrioides

Binomial name
- Sesamia nonagrioides (Lefèbvre, 1827)

Synonyms
- Cossus nonagrioides Lefèbvre, 1827; Nonagria hesperica Rambur, 1837; Nonagria sacchari Wollaston, 1858; Tapinostola gracilis Rebel, 1899 (preocc. Nonagria gracilis Butler, 1880); Sesamia vuteria f. ciccarelli Mariani, 1934

= Sesamia nonagrioides =

Species of moth

Sesamia nonagrioides, the Mediterranean corn borer, pink stalk borer or West African pink borer, is a moth of the family Noctuidae. It was described by Alexandre Louis Lefèbvre de Cérisy in 1827. It is found in Spain, southern France, Italy and on the Balkan Peninsula, as well as in north-western, south-western and western Africa.

The wingspan is 30–40 mm.

The larvae feed on Phragmites communis and Arundo donax and probably also other grasses with thick stems.

== Parasites ==
Cotesia typhae is a braconid wasp used in the biological control of Sesamia nonagrioides
