= Sturmiopsis inferens =

Scientific classification
- Kingdom: Animalia
- Phylum: Arthropoda
- Class: Insecta
- Order: Diptera
- Family: Tachinidae
- Subfamily: Exoristinae
- Tribe: Eryciini
- Genus: Sturmiopsis
- Species: S. inferens

Binomial name
- Sturmiopsis inferens Townsend, 1916

Synonyms
- Winthemia semiberbis Bezzi, 1925

Species of fly

Sturmiopsis inferens is a species of fly in the family Tachinidae. It is native to Asia and is a parasitoid of various moth species whose larvae feed inside the stems of sugarcane, rice and other large grasses, including the Gurdaspur borer (Bissetia steniellus) and the sugarcane shoot borer (Chilo infuscatellus).

== Description ==
Sturmiopsis inferens is a stout fly with a silvery-white head, dark brown forehead, hairy parafacial area, densely hairy eyes, yellowish-brown antennae, silvery-white abdomen and brownish-black legs.

== Distribution ==
Madagascar, Bangladesh, Bhutan, China, India, Indonesia, Malaysia, Nepal, Philippines.

== Host species ==
In Haryana, this fly parasitises the Gurdaspur borer (Bissetia steniellus) and the gold-fringed rice stemborer (Chilo auricilius), in Karnataka it concentrates on the ragi stem borer (Sesamia inferens) and in Odisha, the main host species is the sugarcane shoot borer (Chilo infuscatellus). It also targets other Chilo spp. including Chilo polychrysus, as well as Scirpophaga nivella, which are pests of rice.

== Biology ==
S. inferens is a naturally occurring parasitoid of the sugarcane shoot borer (Chilo infuscatellus) in India, and it has proved possible to use it as a biological control of this sugarcane pest. The fly seems to be most active at temperatures between 27 and 30 °C (81 and 86 °F) and humidities of over 60% and it can now be reared in the laboratory. Each female fly is capable of infecting up to three hundred larvae, and twenty to fifty females can be released per hectare about two months after planting the sugarcane crop in order to achieve control.

This fly is viviparous. A newly hatched female mates with a slightly older male and there follows a gestation period of 12 to 16 days. The female then seeks out a tunnel made by the larvae of a sugarcane borer; she deposits her larvae in the tunnel and they invade the host larvae, making their way in through the cuticle. When fully fed, after 6 to 15 days, the parasitoid larvae pupate in the tunnel, emerging as adults in 12 to 14 days. The length of each life stage depends on the temperature and humidity, the total length of the life cycle being in the range 30 to 45 days.
