= Thyrsis =

Thyrsis or Tirsi may refer to:

- Thyrsis, a character in the first idyll of Theocritus
- Thyrsis, a character in the seventh eclogue of Virgil
- Thyrsis (poem), an 1865 poem by Matthew Arnold
- Thyrsis, a character in the 1608 opera La Dafne by Marco da Gagliano
- Tirsi, one of the characters in Clori, Tirsi e Fileno, a 1707 comic cantata by George Frideric Handel
- Thyrsis, a character in the 1920 play "Aria da Capo" by Edna St. Vincent Millay
- Thyrsis's Cave, a natural cavern located in the Manifold Valley in Staffordshire, England
- Cupidesthes thyrsis, a butterfly in the family Lycaenidae
- Gangara thyrsis, commonly known as the giant redeye, a butterfly belonging to the family Hesperiidae
- Chilo thyrsis, a moth in the family Crambidae

== See also ==
- Thyrsus (disambiguation)
