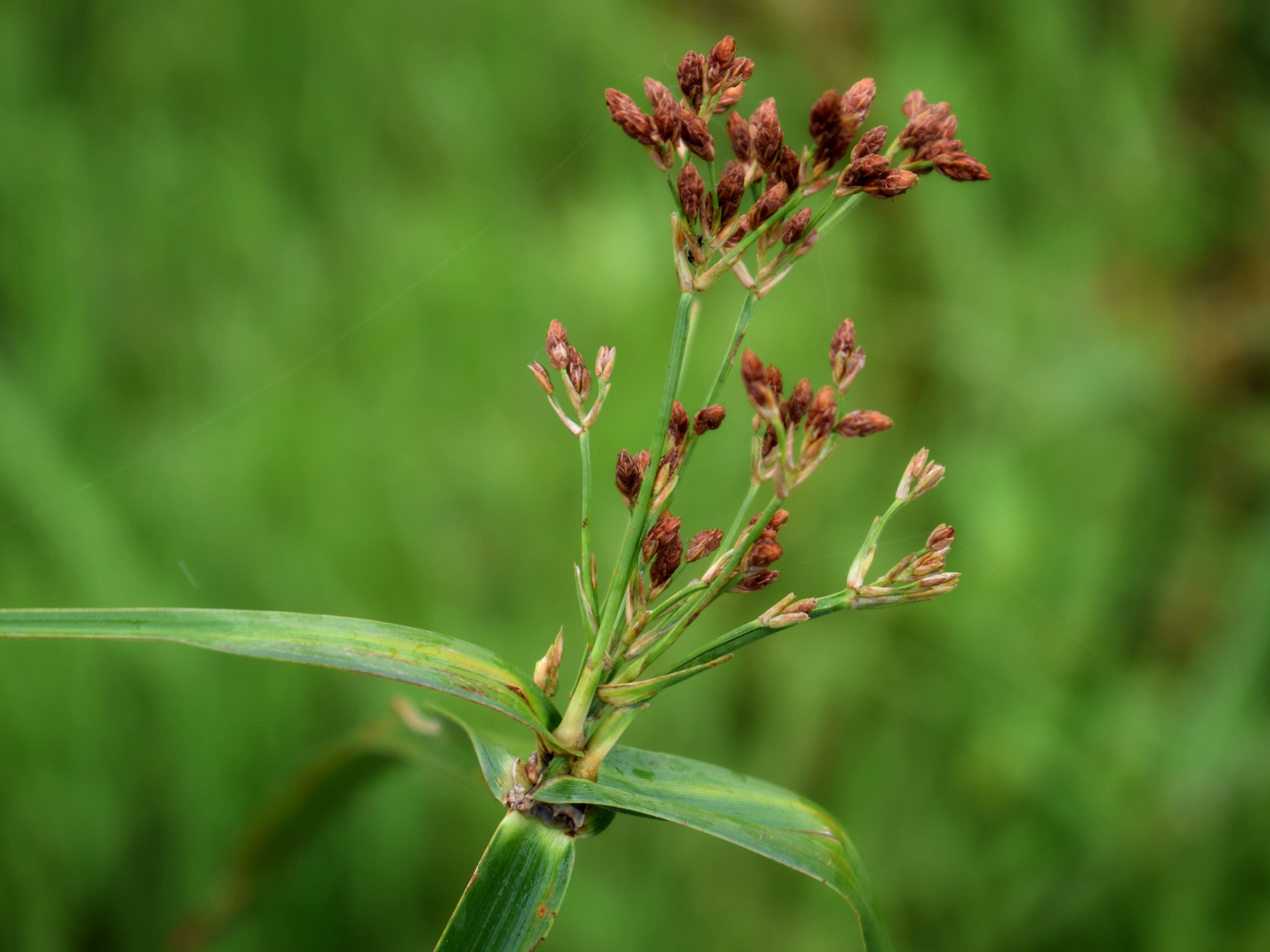
- Actinoscirpus grossus

Scientific classification
- Kingdom: Plantae
- Clade: Tracheophytes
- Clade: Angiosperms
- Clade: Monocots
- Clade: Commelinids
- Order: Poales
- Family: Cyperaceae
- Genus: Actinoscirpus (Ohwi) R.W.Haines & Lye
- Species: A. grossus

Binomial name
- Actinoscirpus grossus (L.f.) Goetgh. & D.A.Simpson

Synonyms
- Genus: Hymenochaeta P.Beauv. ex T.Lestib.; Species: Scirpus grossus L.f.

= Actinoscirpus =

Genus of grass-like plants

Actinoscirpus is a monospecific genus in the family Cyperaceae which contains only the species Actinoscirpus grossus, the greater club rush. It is found across East and South Asia and is known in China as 大藨草; da biao cao, rumput menderong in Malaysian, and kasheruka within Ayurvedic medicine, which uses the tubers as an antiemetic and treatment for liver and digestive diseases. It is a perennial plant that grows rapidly with long rhizomes that end in small tubers. A. grossus is considered a "principal" weed of rice in some Southeast Asian countries. It is abundant in swampy or inundated areas, such as marshes and ditches, and is capable of dominating wetlands and rice patties. It is also a host of Chilo polychrysus, the dark-headed rice borer.

== Description ==
Stands of greater club rush grow to lengths of 1.5 to 2 meters. It grows well in both inundated lands and areas with flooding. Individuals grow in colonies with 10 to 15 centimeters between stems. The tight spacing of stems reduces the speed of flooding and helps filter trash or debris floating in waterways.

== Uses ==
The tubers of A. grossus are used in folk medicine as a treatment for liver disease, although experimental evidence to support this is limited. Ganapathi et al. (2018) showed a protective effect of ethanolic extract of the A. grossus tubers when treating ethanol-induced hepatotoxicity in rats; treatment of the extract significantly restored the liver enzymes, reduced lipid peroxidation, and restored altered catalase and glutathione peroxidase activity.

=== Phytoremediation ===
Studies have shown success using A. grossus and its associated rhizobacteria in improving water quality and removing contaminants through phytoremediation. Syafrizal et al. (2020) has shown success in reducing concentrations of ammonium, phosphate, BOD, COD, and other measures of water quality. Additional studies have also shown success in reducing other contaminants, such as total suspended solids, diesel, and lead, as well as remediating various forms of effluent.

== See also ==
- Fact sheet for Actinoscirpus grossus from the Weed Science Society of America
