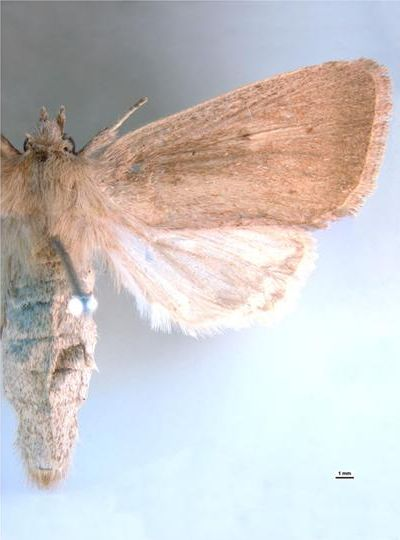
- Female, dorsal view
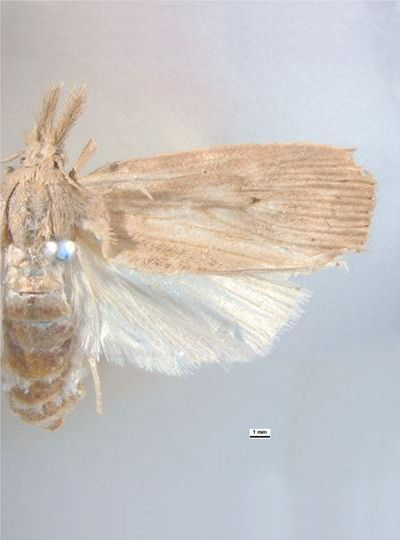
- Male, dorsal view

Scientific classification
- Domain: Eukaryota
- Kingdom: Animalia
- Phylum: Arthropoda
- Class: Insecta
- Order: Lepidoptera
- Superfamily: Noctuoidea
- Family: Noctuidae
- Genus: Sesamia
- Species: S. grisescens

Binomial name
- Sesamia grisescens Warren, 1911

= Sesamia grisescens =

Species of moth

Sesamia grisescens, the pink sugarcane borer, pink stalk borer, shoot borer, sugarcane borer or ramu shoot borer, is a moth of the family Noctuidae. The species was first described by Warren in 1911. It is found in Papua New Guinea, Seram, the Moluccas and New Britain.

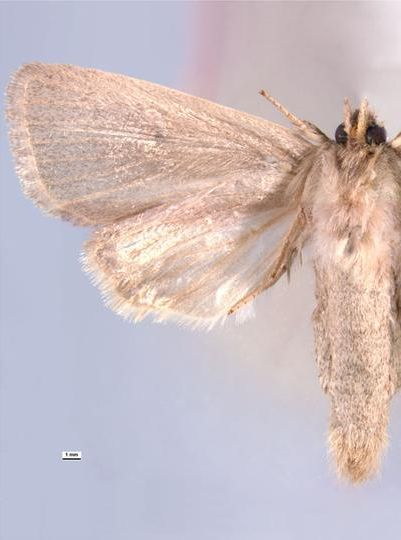
Female, ventral view

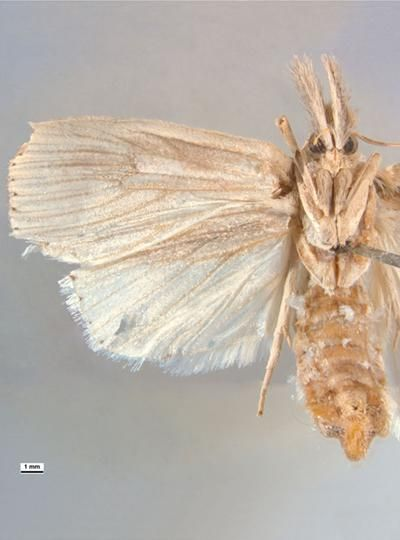
Male, ventral view

The larvae are a pest on Saccharum officinarum, although they also feed on other plants, including Saccharum robustum, Saccharum spontaneum, Saccharum edule, Pennisetum purpureum and Panicum maximum.
