= Bissetia poliella =

Scientific classification
- Kingdom: Animalia
- Phylum: Arthropoda
- Class: Insecta
- Order: Lepidoptera
- Family: Crambidae
- Subfamily: Crambinae
- Tribe: Haimbachiini
- Genus: Bissetia
- Species: B. poliella

Binomial name
- Bissetia poliella (Hampson, 1919)

Synonyms
- Argyria poliella Hampson, 1919; Chilo ascriptalis Hampson, 1919

Species of moth

Bissetia poliella is a moth in the family Crambidae. It was described by George Hampson in 1919. It is found in Ghana, Malawi, Nigeria and Uganda.
