= Chilo crypsimetalla =

Scientific classification
- Kingdom: Animalia
- Phylum: Arthropoda
- Clade: Pancrustacea
- Class: Insecta
- Order: Lepidoptera
- Family: Crambidae
- Genus: Chilo
- Species: C. crypsimetalla

Binomial name
- Chilo crypsimetalla (Turner, 1911)

Synonyms
- Nephalia crypsimetalla Turner, 1911; Diatraea ochrileucalis Hampson, 1919; Schoenobius crossostichus Turner, 1922

Species of moth

Chilo crypsimetalla is a moth in the family Crambidae. It was described by Alfred Jefferis Turner in 1911. It is found in Australia, where it has been recorded from Queensland and the Northern Territory. It is also present on Prince of Wales Island.
