= Chilo heracleus =

Scientific classification
- Kingdom: Animalia
- Phylum: Arthropoda
- Clade: Pancrustacea
- Class: Insecta
- Order: Lepidoptera
- Family: Crambidae
- Genus: Chilo
- Species: C. heracleus

Binomial name
- Chilo heracleus Zeller, 1877

Species of moth

Chilo heracleus is a moth in the family Crambidae. It was described by Zeller in 1877. It is found in Brazil.
