= Chilo luniferalis =

Scientific classification
- Kingdom: Animalia
- Phylum: Arthropoda
- Class: Insecta
- Order: Lepidoptera
- Family: Crambidae
- Genus: Chilo
- Species: C. luniferalis

Binomial name
- Chilo luniferalis Hampson, 1896

Species of moth

Chilo luniferalis is a moth in the family Crambidae. It was described by George Hampson in 1896. It is found in Ethiopia.
