= Chilo niponella =

Scientific classification
- Domain: Eukaryota
- Kingdom: Animalia
- Phylum: Arthropoda
- Class: Insecta
- Order: Lepidoptera
- Family: Crambidae
- Genus: Chilo
- Species: C. niponella

Binomial name
- Chilo niponella (Thunberg, 1788)

Synonyms
- Tinea niponella Thunberg, 1788; Chilo hyrax Bleszynski, 1965

Species of moth

Chilo niponella is a moth in the family Crambidae. It was described by Carl Peter Thunberg in 1788. It is found in Japan and the Russian Far East.
