= Bissetia tauromma =

Scientific classification
- Domain: Eukaryota
- Kingdom: Animalia
- Phylum: Arthropoda
- Class: Insecta
- Order: Lepidoptera
- Family: Crambidae
- Subfamily: Crambinae
- Tribe: Haimbachiini
- Genus: Bissetia
- Species: B. tauromma

Binomial name
- Bissetia tauromma (Kapur, 1950)

Synonyms
- Girdharia tauromma Kapur, 1950

Species of moth

Bissetia tauromma is a moth in the family Crambidae. It was described by A. P. Kapur in 1950. It is found in the Punjab region of what was British India.
