= Chilo leucealis =

Scientific classification
- Domain: Eukaryota
- Kingdom: Animalia
- Phylum: Arthropoda
- Class: Insecta
- Order: Lepidoptera
- Family: Crambidae
- Genus: Chilo
- Species: C. leucealis

Binomial name
- Chilo leucealis (Marion, 1957)

Synonyms
- Anarpia leucealis Marion, 1957

Species of moth

Chilo leucealis is a moth in the family Crambidae. It was described by Hubert Marion in 1957. It is found in Benin.
