= Conicophoria =

Scientific classification
- Domain: Eukaryota
- Kingdom: Animalia
- Phylum: Arthropoda
- Class: Insecta
- Order: Lepidoptera
- Superfamily: Noctuoidea
- Family: Noctuidae
- Subfamily: Acronictinae
- Genus: Conicophoria; Matsumura, 1929
- Species: C. formosana

Binomial name
- Conicophoria formosana Matsumura, 1929

Synonyms
- Sesamia nigropunctata (Wileman, 1912); Archanara nigropunctata Wileman, 1912

Genus of moths

Conicophoria is a monotypic moth genus of the family Noctuidae. Its only species, Conicophoria formosana, is found in Taiwan. Both the genus and species were first described by Shōnen Matsumura in 1929.

== Taxonomy ==
Lepidoptera and Some Other Life Forms gives this name as a synonym of Sesamia Guenée, 1852.
