= Chilo flavirufalis =

Scientific classification
- Kingdom: Animalia
- Phylum: Arthropoda
- Class: Insecta
- Order: Lepidoptera
- Family: Crambidae
- Genus: Chilo
- Species: C. flavirufalis

Binomial name
- Chilo flavirufalis (Hampson, 1919)

Synonyms
- Hypiesta flavirufalis Hampson, 1919

Species of moth

Chilo flavirufalis is a moth in the family Crambidae. It was described by George Hampson in 1919. It is found in Kenya.
