= Chilo aleniella =

Scientific classification
- Domain: Eukaryota
- Kingdom: Animalia
- Phylum: Arthropoda
- Class: Insecta
- Order: Lepidoptera
- Family: Crambidae
- Genus: Chilo
- Species: C. aleniella

Binomial name
- Chilo aleniella (Strand, 1913)

Synonyms
- Diatraea aleniella Strand, 1913

Species of moth

Chilo aleniella is a moth in the family Crambidae. It was described by Strand in 1913. It is found in Equatorial Guinea.
