= Thyrsus (disambiguation) =

A thyrsus is a staff of giant fennel covered with ivy vines and leaves.

Thyrsus may also refer to:

- Thyrsus (grasshopper), a genus of grasshopper in the family Tetrigidae
- Thyrsus (giant) a mythical figure from Austria
- Saint Thyrsus (died 251), Christian martyr
- Thyrsus (Mage: the Awakening), a Mage character
- Thyrsus González de Santalla (1624-1705), Spanish theologian

== See also ==
- Thyrsis (disambiguation)
- Thyrse, a flowering plant structure called thyrsus in botanical Latin
