= Chilo zacconius =

Scientific classification
- Kingdom: Animalia
- Phylum: Arthropoda
- Class: Insecta
- Order: Lepidoptera
- Family: Crambidae
- Genus: Chilo
- Species: C. zacconius

Binomial name
- Chilo zacconius Błeszyński, 1970

Species of moth

Chilo zacconius is a moth in the family Crambidae. It was described by Stanisław Błeszyński in 1970. It is found in Senegal.
