= Chilo perfusalis =

Scientific classification
- Kingdom: Animalia
- Phylum: Arthropoda
- Class: Insecta
- Order: Lepidoptera
- Family: Crambidae
- Genus: Chilo
- Species: C. perfusalis

Binomial name
- Chilo perfusalis (Hampson, 1919)

Synonyms
- Diatraea perfusalis Hampson, 1919

Species of moth

Chilo perfusalis is a moth in the family Crambidae. It was described by George Hampson in 1919. It is found in Nigeria.
