= Chilo mercatorius =

Scientific classification
- Domain: Eukaryota
- Kingdom: Animalia
- Phylum: Arthropoda
- Class: Insecta
- Order: Lepidoptera
- Family: Crambidae
- Genus: Chilo
- Species: C. mercatorius

Binomial name
- Chilo mercatorius Błeszyński, 1970

Species of moth

Chilo mercatorius is a moth in the family Crambidae. It was described by Stanisław Błeszyński in 1970. It is found in the Democratic Republic of the Congo.
