= Chilo agamemnon =

Scientific classification
- Kingdom: Animalia
- Phylum: Arthropoda
- Class: Insecta
- Order: Lepidoptera
- Family: Crambidae
- Genus: Chilo
- Species: C. agamemnon

Binomial name
- Chilo agamemnon Błeszyński, 1962

Species of moth

Chilo agamemnon is a species of moth in the family Crambidae described by Stanisław Błeszyński in 1962. It is found in Spain, Egypt, Israel, Sudan and Uganda.

The wingspan is 16–19 mm. The larvae are a pest on Zea mays.
