= Sesamia cretica =

Scientific classification
- Kingdom: Animalia
- Phylum: Arthropoda
- Clade: Pancrustacea
- Class: Insecta
- Order: Lepidoptera
- Superfamily: Noctuoidea
- Family: Noctuidae
- Genus: Sesamia
- Species: S. cretica

Binomial name
- Sesamia cretica Lederer, 1857

Synonyms
- Nonagria cyrnaea Mabille, 1866; Sesamia fraterna Moore, 1882; Sesamia pecki Tams, 1938; Sesamia striata Staudinger, 1888

Species of moth

Sesamia cretica, the corn stem borer, greater sugarcane borer, sorghum stem borer, stem corn borer, durra stem borer, large corn borer, pink sugarcane borer, sugarcane pink borer, sorghum borer, pink corn borer, maize borer or purple stem borer, is a moth of the family Noctuidae. It was described by Julius Lederer in 1857. It is found in most of the countries and islands of the Mediterranean basin. The range extends through the Middle East and Arabia to Pakistan, northern India and northern Africa. In the south, the range extends to northern Kenya and northern Cameroon.

The larvae are a pest. They have been recorded feeding on Oryza sativa, Panicum miliaceum, Pennisetum glaucum, Poaceae species, Saccharum officinarum, Sorghum bicolor, Triticum species and Zea mays. They feed on the epidermal tissues and later bore into the heart of the host plant.
