= Chilo spatiosellus =

Scientific classification
- Domain: Eukaryota
- Kingdom: Animalia
- Phylum: Arthropoda
- Class: Insecta
- Order: Lepidoptera
- Family: Crambidae
- Genus: Chilo
- Species: C. spatiosellus

Binomial name
- Chilo spatiosellus Möschler, 1882

Species of moth

Chilo spatiosellus is a moth in the family Crambidae. It was described by Heinrich Benno Möschler in 1882. It is found in Suriname.
