= Chilo tamsi =

Scientific classification
- Domain: Eukaryota
- Kingdom: Animalia
- Phylum: Arthropoda
- Class: Insecta
- Order: Lepidoptera
- Family: Crambidae
- Genus: Chilo
- Species: C. tamsi

Binomial name
- Chilo tamsi Kapur, 1950

Species of moth

Chilo tamsi is a moth in the family Crambidae. It was described by A. P. Kapur in 1950. It is found in India.
