= Chilo chiriquitensis =

Scientific classification
- Kingdom: Animalia
- Phylum: Arthropoda
- Clade: Pancrustacea
- Class: Insecta
- Order: Lepidoptera
- Family: Crambidae
- Genus: Chilo
- Species: C. chiriquitensis

Binomial name
- Chilo chiriquitensis (Zeller, 1877)

Synonyms
- Eromene chiriquitensis Zeller, 1877; Silveria adelphilia Dyar, 1925; Silveria hexhex Dyar, 1925

Species of moth

Chilo chiriquitensis is a moth in the family Crambidae. It was described by Philipp Christoph Zeller in 1877. It is found in Mexico, Panama and Guatemala.
