= Chilo louisiadalis =

Scientific classification
- Kingdom: Animalia
- Phylum: Arthropoda
- Class: Insecta
- Order: Lepidoptera
- Family: Crambidae
- Genus: Chilo
- Species: C. louisiadalis

Binomial name
- Chilo louisiadalis (Hampson, 1919)

Synonyms
- Diatraea louisiadalis Hampson, 1919

Species of moth

Chilo louisiadalis is a moth in the family Crambidae. It was described by George Hampson in 1919. It is found on the Louisiade Archipelago.
