= Chilo tumidicostalis =

Scientific classification
- Kingdom: Animalia
- Phylum: Arthropoda
- Class: Insecta
- Order: Lepidoptera
- Family: Crambidae
- Genus: Chilo
- Species: C. tumidicostalis

Binomial name
- Chilo tumidicostalis (Hampson, 1919)

Synonyms
- Argyria tumidicostalis Hampson, 1919; Chilo gemininotalis Hampson, 1919

Species of moth

Chilo tumidicostalis is a moth in the family Crambidae. It was described by George Hampson in 1919. It is found in India (Bengal, Assam) and Nepal.
