= Chilo vergilius =

Scientific classification
- Domain: Eukaryota
- Kingdom: Animalia
- Phylum: Arthropoda
- Class: Insecta
- Order: Lepidoptera
- Family: Crambidae
- Genus: Chilo
- Species: C. vergilius

Binomial name
- Chilo vergilius Błeszyński, 1970

Species of moth

Chilo vergilius is a moth in the family Crambidae. It was described by Stanisław Błeszyński in 1970. It is found in India.
