= Sturmiopsis =

Scientific classification
- Kingdom: Animalia
- Phylum: Arthropoda
- Class: Insecta
- Order: Diptera
- Family: Tachinidae
- Subfamily: Exoristinae
- Tribe: Eryciini
- Genus: Sturmiopsis; Townsend, 1916

Synonyms
- Curranomyia Townsend, 1941; Rhodesina Curran, 1939

Genus of flies

Sturmiopsis is a genus of flies in the family Tachinidae.

== Species ==
- Sturmiopsis emdeni Mesnil, 1952
- Sturmiopsis inferens Townsend, 1916
- Sturmiopsis parasitica (Curran, 1939)
- Sturmiopsis setifrons Mesnil, 1977
