= Chilo kanra =

Scientific classification
- Domain: Eukaryota
- Kingdom: Animalia
- Phylum: Arthropoda
- Class: Insecta
- Order: Lepidoptera
- Family: Crambidae
- Genus: Chilo
- Species: C. kanra

Binomial name
- Chilo kanra (T. B. Fletcher, 1928)

Synonyms
- Diatraea kanra T. B. Fletcher, 1928; Chilo saccharicola T. B. Fletcher, 1928

Species of moth

Chilo kanra is a moth in the family Crambidae. It was described by Thomas Bainbrigge Fletcher in 1928. It is found in India.
