= Chilo subbivittalis =

Scientific classification
- Domain: Eukaryota
- Kingdom: Animalia
- Phylum: Arthropoda
- Class: Insecta
- Order: Lepidoptera
- Family: Crambidae
- Genus: Chilo
- Species: C. subbivittalis

Binomial name
- Chilo subbivittalis (Gaede, 1917)

Synonyms
- Diatraea subbivittalis Gaede, 1917

Species of moth

Chilo subbivittalis is a moth in the family Crambidae. It was described by Max Gaede in 1917. It is found in Tanzania.
