= Chilo ingloriellus =

Scientific classification
- Domain: Eukaryota
- Kingdom: Animalia
- Phylum: Arthropoda
- Class: Insecta
- Order: Lepidoptera
- Family: Crambidae
- Genus: Chilo
- Species: C. ingloriellus

Binomial name
- Chilo ingloriellus Möschler, 1882

Species of moth

Chilo ingloriellus is a moth in the family Crambidae. It was described by Heinrich Benno Möschler in 1882. It is found in Suriname.
