= Chilo christophi =

Scientific classification
- Kingdom: Animalia
- Phylum: Arthropoda
- Clade: Pancrustacea
- Class: Insecta
- Order: Lepidoptera
- Family: Crambidae
- Genus: Chilo
- Species: C. christophi

Binomial name
- Chilo christophi Błeszyński, 1965

Synonyms
- Chilo antipai Popescu-Gorj, 1968

Species of moth

Chilo christophi is a species of moth in the family Crambidae described by Stanisław Błeszyński in 1965. It is found in Romania, the southern Ural region, Armenia, Djarkent, Issyk-Kul, Thian-Shan, Kuldja, Amur, Ussuri, northern China and Japan.

The length of the forewings is 14–19 mm.
