= Bissetia leucomeralis =

Scientific classification
- Kingdom: Animalia
- Phylum: Arthropoda
- Class: Insecta
- Order: Lepidoptera
- Family: Crambidae
- Subfamily: Crambinae
- Tribe: Haimbachiini
- Genus: Bissetia
- Species: B. leucomeralis

Binomial name
- Bissetia leucomeralis (Hampson, 1919)

Synonyms
- Argyria leucomeralis Hampson, 1919

Species of moth

Bissetia leucomeralis is a moth in the family Crambidae. It was described by George Hampson in 1919. It is found in Sierra Leone.
