= Chilo costifusalis =

Scientific classification
- Kingdom: Animalia
- Phylum: Arthropoda
- Class: Insecta
- Order: Lepidoptera
- Family: Crambidae
- Genus: Chilo
- Species: C. costifusalis

Binomial name
- Chilo costifusalis (Hampson, 1919)

Synonyms
- Diatraea costifusalis Hampson, 1919

Species of moth

Chilo costifusalis is a moth in the family Crambidae. It was described by George Hampson in 1919. It is found in Malawi, Niger and Nigeria.
