= Chilo mesoplagalis =

Scientific classification
- Kingdom: Animalia
- Phylum: Arthropoda
- Class: Insecta
- Order: Lepidoptera
- Family: Crambidae
- Genus: Chilo
- Species: C. mesoplagalis

Binomial name
- Chilo mesoplagalis (Hampson, 1919)

Synonyms
- Diatraea mesoplagalis Hampson, 1919

Species of moth

Chilo mesoplagalis is a moth in the family Crambidae. It was described by George Hampson in 1919. It is found in Nigeria, Sierra Leone and Uganda.
