= Chilo panici =

Scientific classification
- Domain: Eukaryota
- Kingdom: Animalia
- Phylum: Arthropoda
- Class: Insecta
- Order: Lepidoptera
- Family: Crambidae
- Genus: Chilo
- Species: C. panici

Binomial name
- Chilo panici Wang & Sung, 1981

Species of moth

Chilo panici is a moth in the family Crambidae. It was described by Wang and Sung in 1981. It is found in China (Heilongjiang).
