= Bissetia subfumalis =

Scientific classification
- Kingdom: Animalia
- Phylum: Arthropoda
- Class: Insecta
- Order: Lepidoptera
- Family: Crambidae
- Subfamily: Crambinae
- Tribe: Haimbachiini
- Genus: Bissetia
- Species: B. subfumalis

Binomial name
- Bissetia subfumalis (Hampson, 1896)

Synonyms
- Talis subfumalis Hampson, 1896

Species of moth

Bissetia subfumalis is a moth in the family Crambidae. It was described by George Hampson in 1896. It is found in Australia, where it has been recorded from the Northern Territory.
