= Chilo cinnamomellus =

Scientific classification
- Domain: Eukaryota
- Kingdom: Animalia
- Phylum: Arthropoda
- Class: Insecta
- Order: Lepidoptera
- Family: Crambidae
- Genus: Chilo
- Species: C. cinnamomellus

Binomial name
- Chilo cinnamomellus Berg, 1875

Species of moth

Chilo cinnamomellus is a moth in the family Crambidae. It was described by Carlos Berg in 1875 and is found in Argentina.
