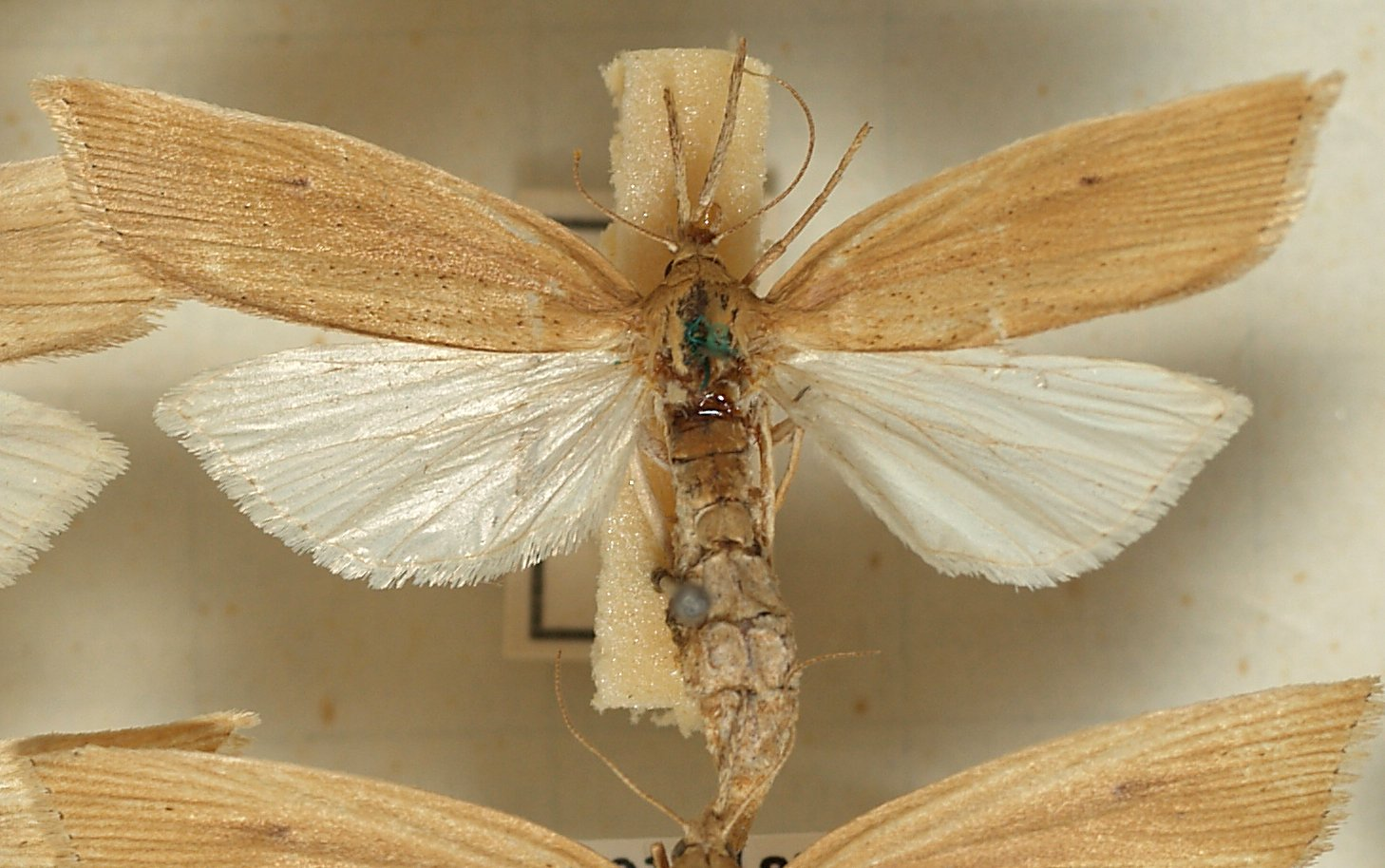

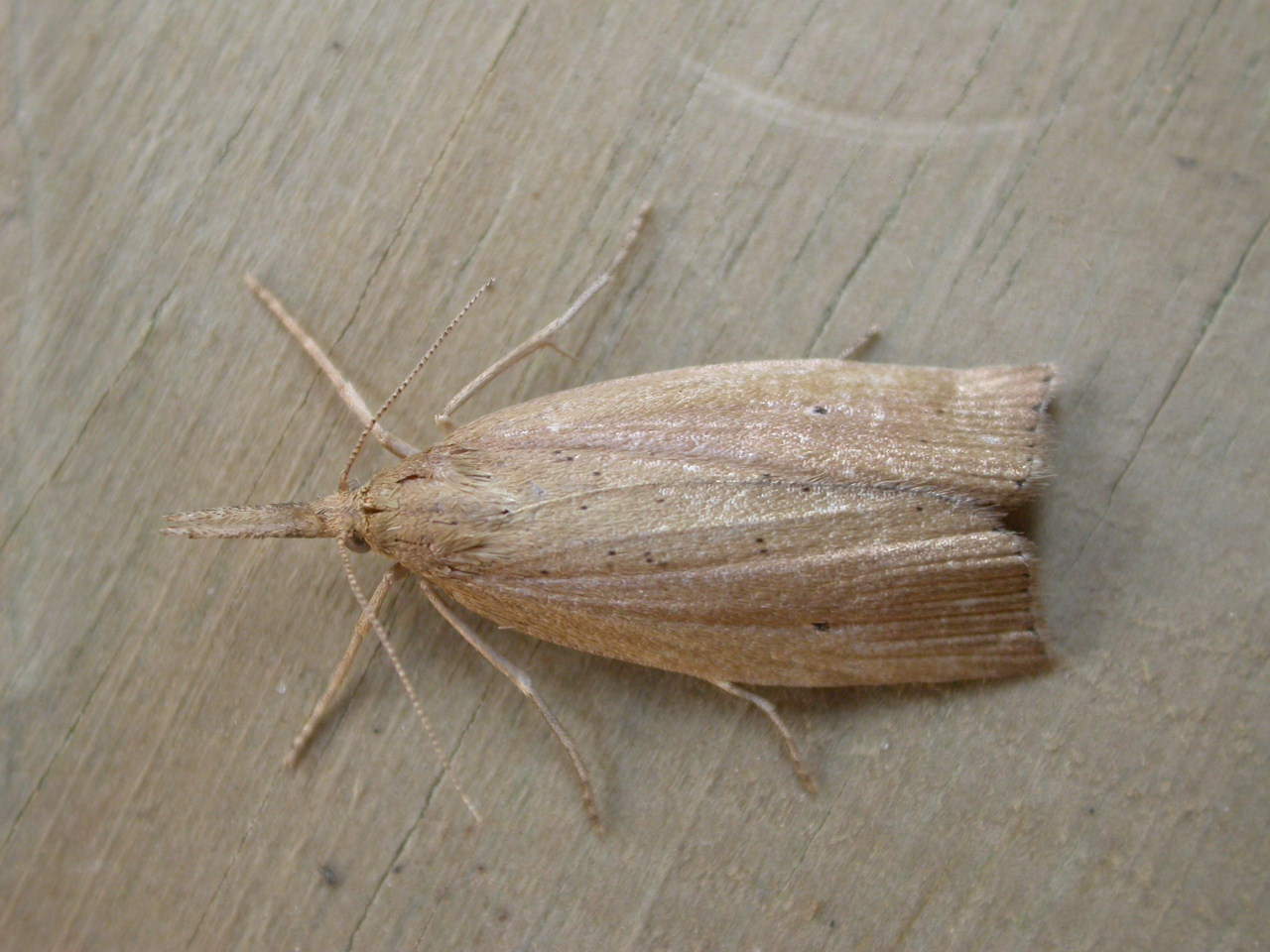

Scientific classification
- Kingdom: Animalia
- Phylum: Arthropoda
- Class: Insecta
- Order: Lepidoptera
- Family: Crambidae
- Genus: Chilo
- Species: C. phragmitella

Binomial name
- Chilo phragmitella (Hübner, 1805)

Synonyms
- Tinea phragmitella Hübner, 1805–1810; Chilo phragmitellus (lapsus); Chilo phragmitellus f. intermediellus Raebel, 1925; Chilo phragmitellus f. nigricellus Raebel, 1925; Palparia rhombea Haworth, 1811; Topeutis phragmitalis Hübner, 1825

= Chilo phragmitella =

Species of moth

Chilo phragmitella is a species of moth of the family Crambidae, sometimes referred to by the vernacular names wainscot veneer or reed veneer. It was first described by Jacob Hübner between 1805 and 1810 as Tinea phragmitella, and is the type species of the genus Chilo.

Chilo phragmitella occurs in wetland habitats with reed beds and paddy fields, and can be found in much of Europe, including Great-Britain, and parts of Asia.

== Original description ==
=== Date of original description ===
The species was, as Tinea phragmitella, first described by Jacob Hübner in his work Sammlung europäischer Schmetterlinge, a multi-volume work with publication dates from 1793 to 1841. Francis Hemming, in his 1937 systematic treatment of the entomological works of Jacob Hübner, narrowed the range of years in which the description of Tinea phragmitella may have been published to 1805–1810.

=== Etymology ===
The specific name phragmitella refers to the species' larval food source.

== Distribution and habitat ==
Chilo phragmitella occurs in most of Europe, including the British Isles. It is also known from parts of Asia, including Iran, Iraq, Japan and China. It is found in wetlands with large reed beds and paddy fields.

== Behaviour and appearance ==
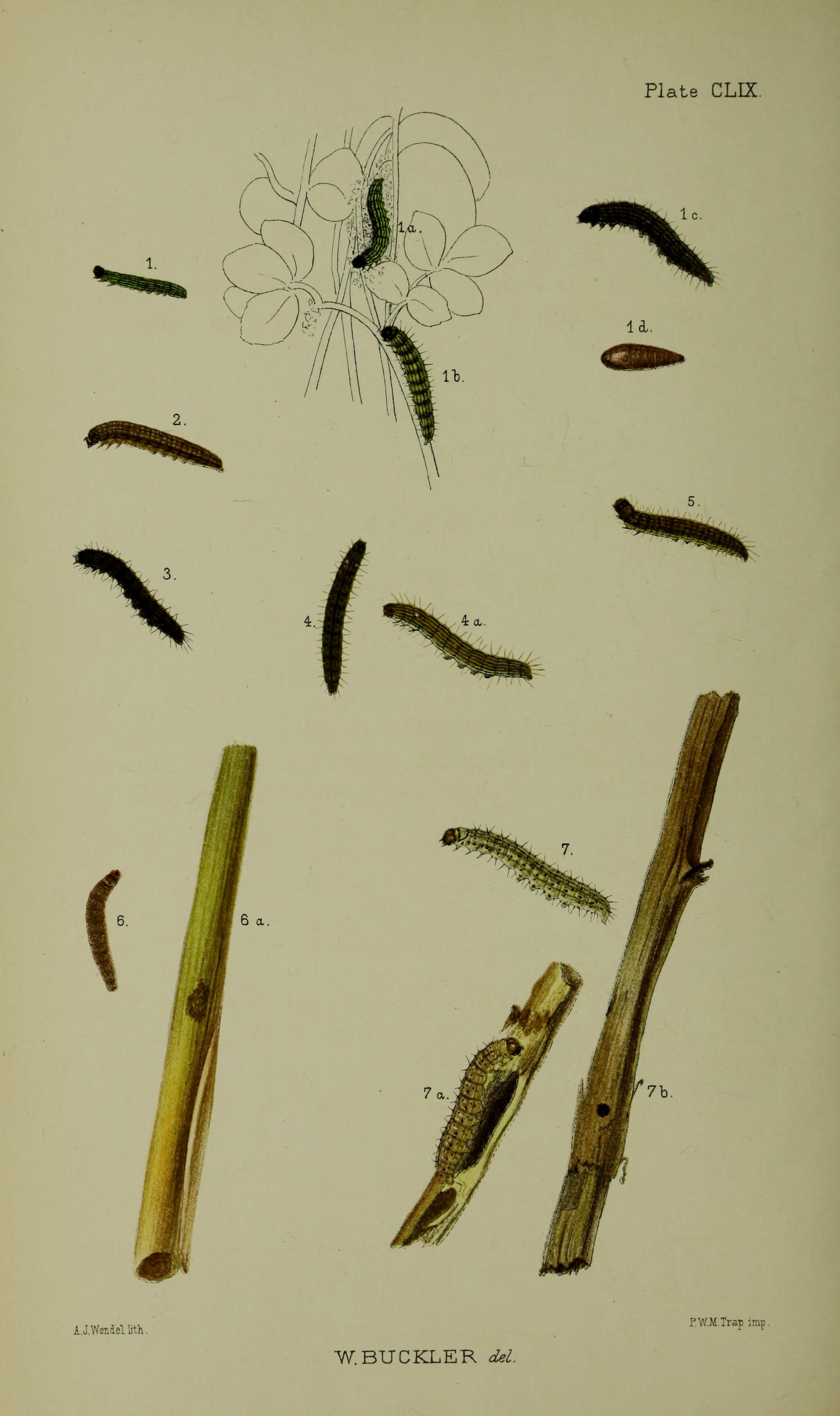
Fig. 7 depicts a larva of C. phragmitella, 7a a larva of C. phragmitella after its final moult, and 7b depicts a reed containing a larva

=== Immature stages ===
Larvae are whitish and feed internally from stem and rootstock of common reed (Phragmites australis) and reed sweet-grass (Glyceria maxima). Larvae take two years to mature. Prior to pupation, the larva creates a hole in the stem to exit from as moth. Pupation occurs within the stem beneath the exit created by the larva.

=== Adult ===
Adults are sexually dimorphic, with smaller, darker males. Wingspan is respectively 24–32 mm for males and 30–40 mm for females. Both sexes have long labial palpi. Female specimens of Chilo phragmitella may resemble those of Donacaula forficella.

In Great-Britain, adults are on wing from June to July in a single generation.

=== Handbook of British Lepidoptera ===
The following description of Chilo phragmitella was published in Edward Meyrick's 1895 A Handbook of British Lepidoptera:

The face with a conical horny projection. The labial palpi longer than head and thorax. Forewings in female much narrower and more acute than in male; pale ochreous, more or less suffused with brown, especially in male, tending to form dark streaks on and between veins; a dark fuscous discal dot; termen sinuate. Hindwings are pale whitish-ochreous or whitish, The larva is ochreous -whitish; dorsal, subdorsal, and lateral lines reddish -brown; head and plate of 2 yellowish -brown.

— Edward Meyrick

See also Parsons et al.
