= Chilo recalvus =

Scientific classification
- Kingdom: Animalia
- Phylum: Arthropoda
- Class: Insecta
- Order: Lepidoptera
- Family: Crambidae
- Genus: Chilo
- Species: C. recalvus

Binomial name
- Chilo recalvus (Wallengren, 1876)

Synonyms
- Crambus recalvus Wallengren, 1876

Species of moth

Chilo recalvus is a moth in the family Crambidae. It was described by Wallengren in 1876. It is found in South Africa.
