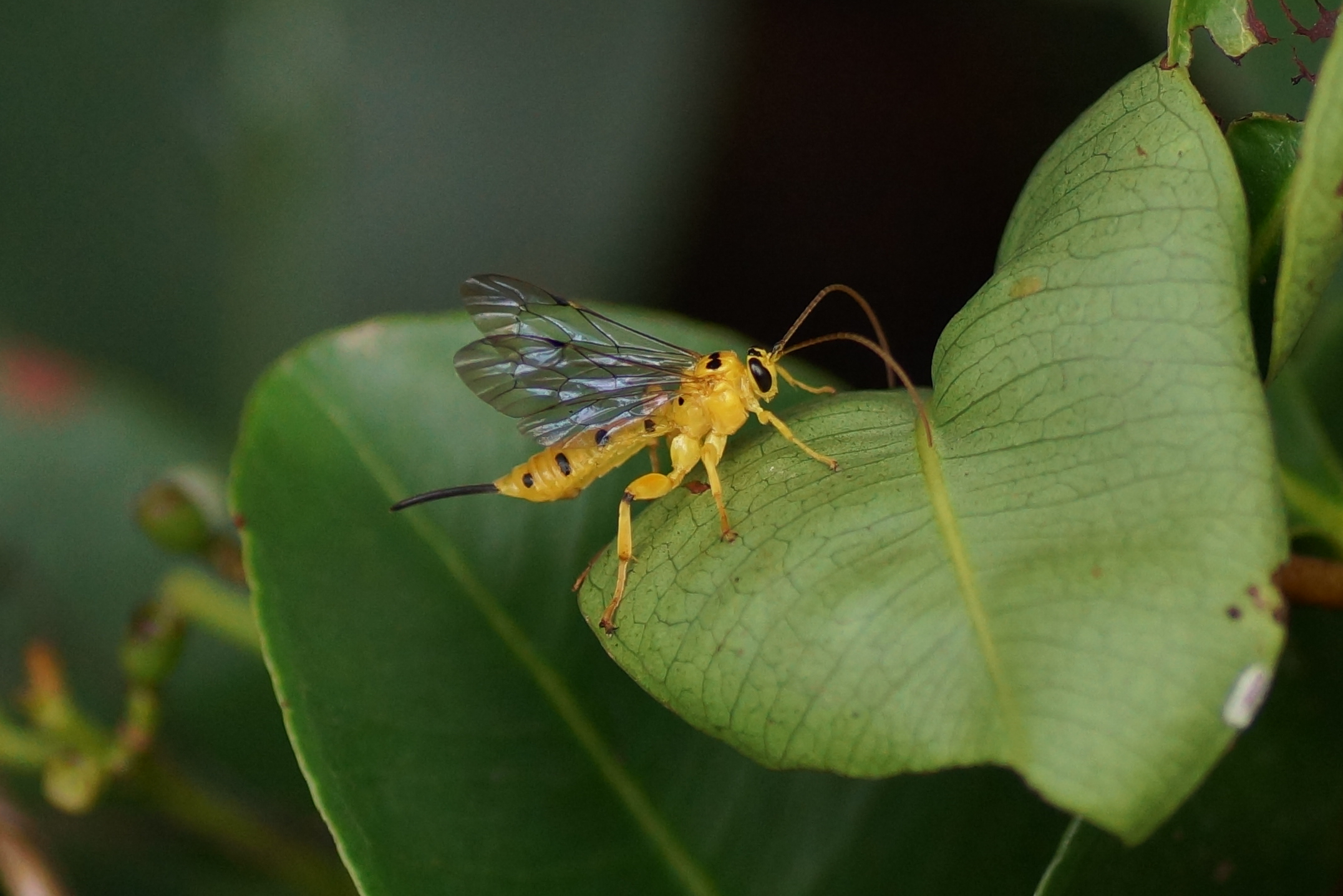
- Xanthopimpla punctata

Scientific classification
- Kingdom: Animalia
- Phylum: Arthropoda
- Clade: Pancrustacea
- Class: Insecta
- Order: Hymenoptera
- Family: Ichneumonidae
- Subfamily: Pimplinae
- Tribe: Pimplini
- Genus: Xanthopimpla; Saussure, 1892

= Xanthopimpla =

Genus of wasps

Xanthopimpla is a genus of parasitoid wasps belonging to the family Ichneumonidae.

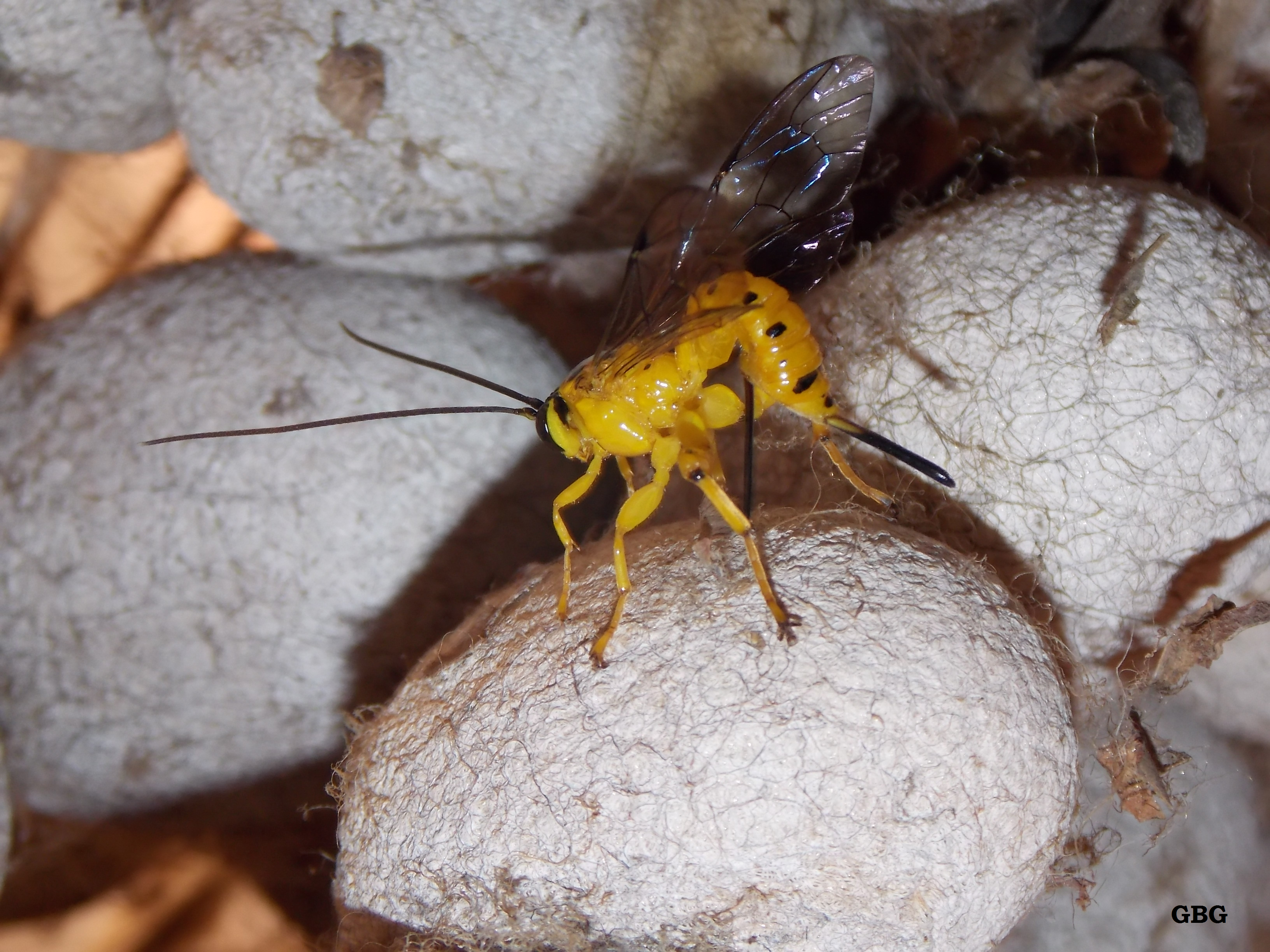
X. regina ovipositing into a Tasar silkworm pupa

The genus has an almost cosmopolitan distribution, being recorded in 121 countries & introduced to 5. Members of this genus are used as biological control agents for Lepidopteran agricultural pests.

== Description & Ecology ==
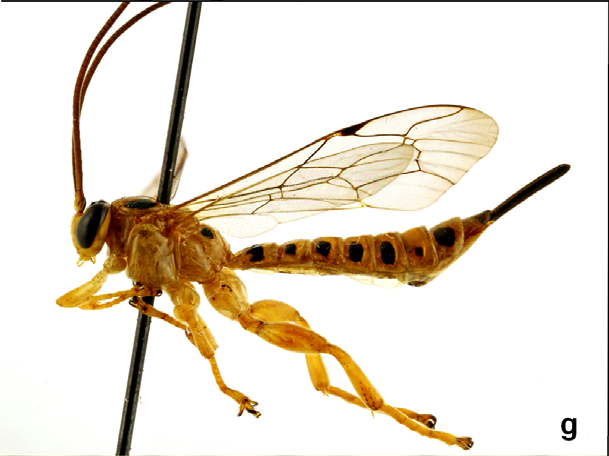
X. stemmator

Members of Xanthopimpla display yellow bodies with stout legs, and will have black spots or bands along their abdominal tergites. Xanthopimpla species can be distinguished from those of other genera by their bidentate mandibles and twisted lower teeth.

Wasps in this genus are solitary koinoboint endoparasitoids that lay their eggs inside larvae and pupae of Lepidoptera.

== Species ==
There are at least 450 species within this genus. The Global Biodiversity Information Facility includes:

1. Xanthopimpla abnormis Krieger, 1914
2. Xanthopimpla acuta Seyrig, 1932
3. Xanthopimpla adnata Chao, 1997
4. Xanthopimpla aliena Krieger, 1914
5. Xanthopimpla allpahuaya Gomez & Saaksjarvi
6. Xanthopimpla alternans Krieger, 1915
7. Xanthopimpla amazonica Gómez, Sääksjärvi & Veijalainen, 2009
8. Xanthopimpla amon Gauld, 1984
9. Xanthopimpla amphimelaena Townes & Chiu, 1970
10. Xanthopimpla anchoroides Chao, 1997
11. Xanthopimpla ankhu Gauld, 1984
12. Xanthopimpla annulata Cushman, 1925
13. Xanthopimpla ansata Krieger, 1915
14. Xanthopimpla apicalis (Smith, 1863)
15. Xanthopimpla appendicularis (Cameron, 1899)
16. Xanthopimpla arealis Krieger, 1899
17. Xanthopimpla articulata Seyrig, 1932
18. Xanthopimpla atriclunis Townes & Chiu, 1970
19. Xanthopimpla attenuata Townes & Chiu, 1970
20. Xanthopimpla aurita Krieger, 1915
21. Xanthopimpla australis Krieger, 1899
22. Xanthopimpla barak Gauld, 1984
23. Xanthopimpla barodaensis Lal, 1968
24. Xanthopimpla biamosa Khalaim, 2008
25. Xanthopimpla bifida Townes & Chiu, 1970
26. Xanthopimpla bilateralis Chao, 1997
27. Xanthopimpla binghami Cameron, 1908
28. Xanthopimpla binodus Townes & Chiu, 1970
29. Xanthopimpla bistrigata Szepligeti, 1908
30. Xanthopimpla bitaeniata Townes & Chiu, 1970
31. Xanthopimpla brachycentra Krieger, 1914
32. Xanthopimpla brachyparea Krieger, 1914
33. Xanthopimpla brevibasis Townes & Chiu, 1970
34. Xanthopimpla brevicarina Wang, 1987
35. Xanthopimpla brevicauda Cushman, 1925
36. Xanthopimpla brullei Krieger, 1899
37. Xanthopimpla buettneri Krieger, 1915
38. Xanthopimpla cacerymna Townes & Chiu, 1970
39. Xanthopimpla calva Townes & Chiu, 1970
40. Xanthopimpla cera Cameron, 1908
41. Xanthopimpla cheesmanae Townes & Chiu, 1970
42. Xanthopimpla ciboisae Klopfstein, 2022
43. Xanthopimpla circularis Krieger, 1914
44. Xanthopimpla citrina (Holmgren, 1868)
45. Xanthopimpla clavata Krieger, 1914
46. Xanthopimpla clivulus Townes & Chiu, 1970
47. Xanthopimpla coalita Krieger, 1915
48. Xanthopimpla coelocnema Krieger, 1915
49. Xanthopimpla conica Cushman, 1925
50. Xanthopimpla connexa Krieger, 1915
51. Xanthopimpla conradti Krieger, 1915
52. Xanthopimpla corynoceros Krieger, 1915
53. Xanthopimpla costicoxis Townes & Chiu, 1970
54. Xanthopimpla craspedoptera Krieger, 1915
55. Xanthopimpla crassipes (Brulle, 1846)
56. Xanthopimpla crassipuncta Wang & Huang, 1993
57. Xanthopimpla crescendae Klopfstein, 2022
58. Xanthopimpla cruralis Townes & Chiu, 1970
59. Xanthopimpla cryptata Seyrig, 1932
60. Xanthopimpla cuneata Krieger, 1915
61. Xanthopimpla curta Townes & Chiu, 1970
62. Xanthopimpla curvata Seyrig, 1932
63. Xanthopimpla curvicaudata Benoit, 1953
64. Xanthopimpla curvimaculata (Cameron, 1899)
65. Xanthopimpla decurtata Krieger, 1914
66. Xanthopimpla densa Townes & Chiu, 1970
67. Xanthopimpla deplanata Seyrig, 1932
68. Xanthopimpla despinosa Krieger, 1915
69. Xanthopimpla detrita Townes & Chiu, 1970
70. Xanthopimpla didyma Chao, 1997
71. Xanthopimpla diplonyx Townes & Chiu, 1970
72. Xanthopimpla disjuncta Townes & Chiu, 1970
73. Xanthopimpla divergens Townes & Chiu, 1970
74. Xanthopimpla dorsigera (Saussure, 1892)
75. Xanthopimpla dumazeri Seyrig, 1932
76. Xanthopimpla dysticha Townes & Chiu, 1970
77. Xanthopimpla ecaudata Krieger, 1899
78. Xanthopimpla edentangula Roman, 1913
79. Xanthopimpla elegans (Vollenhoven, 1879)
80. Xanthopimpla enderleini Krieger, 1915
81. Xanthopimpla eous Morley, 1912
82. Xanthopimpla eurycephala Krieger, 1915
83. Xanthopimpla euryglutus Townes & Chiu, 1970
84. Xanthopimpla exigua Krieger, 1914
85. Xanthopimpla exigutubula Wang, 1987
86. Xanthopimpla exocha Townes & Chiu, 1970
87. Xanthopimpla fastigiata Krieger, 1915
88. Xanthopimpla femoralis Townes & Chiu, 1970
89. Xanthopimpla ferruginea (Smith, 1858)
90. Xanthopimpla flava (Ashmead, 1904)
91. Xanthopimpla flaviceps Townes & Chiu, 1970
92. Xanthopimpla flavicorpora Wang, 1987
93. Xanthopimpla flavipennis Townes & Chiu, 1970
94. Xanthopimpla flavolineata Cameron, 1907
95. Xanthopimpla fortis Townes & Chiu, 1970
96. Xanthopimpla fraterculus Townes & Chiu, 1970
97. Xanthopimpla frontalis Krieger, 1914
98. Xanthopimpla fucata Seyrig, 1932
99. Xanthopimpla furcata Chao, 1997
100. Xanthopimpla fusconotata (Tosquinet, 1896)
101. Xanthopimpla gampsura Krieger, 1914
102. Xanthopimpla gemelligutta Chao, 1997
103. Xanthopimpla glaberrima Roman, 1913
104. Xanthopimpla granulata Seyrig, 1932
105. Xanthopimpla guianensis Gómez & Sääksjärvi, 2014
106. Xanthopimpla guptai Townes & Chiu, 1970
107. Xanthopimpla habermehli Krieger, 1915
108. Xanthopimpla heinrichi Townes & Chiu, 1970
109. Xanthopimpla heymonsi Krieger, 1915
110. Xanthopimpla hiatus Townes & Chiu, 1970
111. Xanthopimpla hildebrandti Krieger, 1915
112. Xanthopimpla hirsuta (Girault, 1930)
113. Xanthopimpla honorata (Cameron, 1899)
114. Xanthopimpla hova Saussure, 1892
115. Xanthopimpla incompleta Krieger, 1915
116. Xanthopimpla indica Rao & Grover, 1960
117. Xanthopimpla interceptor (Smith, 1865)
118. Xanthopimpla jacobsoni Krieger, 1915
119. Xanthopimpla jonathani Townes & Chiu, 1970
120. Xanthopimpla jussilai Veijalainen, Sääksjärvi & Broad, 2009
121. Xanthopimpla konowi Krieger, 1899
122. Xanthopimpla labiata Cameron, 1902
123. Xanthopimpla lambertoni Seyrig, 1934
124. Xanthopimpla latibasis Townes & Chiu, 1970
125. Xanthopimpla laticeps Townes & Chiu, 1970
126. Xanthopimpla latifacialis Huang & Wang, 1996
127. Xanthopimpla latifrons Townes & Chiu, 1970
128. Xanthopimpla leiperyma Townes & Chiu, 1970
129. Xanthopimpla lepcha (Cameron, 1899)
130. Xanthopimpla leptosoma Townes & Chiu, 1970
131. Xanthopimpla levibasis Townes, 1973
132. Xanthopimpla levis Krieger, 1915
133. Xanthopimpla leviuscula Krieger, 1914
134. Xanthopimpla lissopleuris Townes & Chiu, 1970
135. Xanthopimpla longispina Townes & Chiu, 1970
136. Xanthopimpla longqiensis Wang & Huang, 1993
137. Xanthopimpla luteipennis Townes & Chiu, 1970
138. Xanthopimpla luzonensis Krieger, 1914
139. Xanthopimpla maculata Seyrig, 1932
140. Xanthopimpla maculicauda Townes & Chiu, 1970
141. Xanthopimpla maculicoxis Townes & Chiu, 1970
142. Xanthopimpla magnimacula Wang, 1992
143. Xanthopimpla mardiensis Izfa & Idris, 2006
144. Xanthopimpla maschala Townes & Chiu, 1970
145. Xanthopimpla melanacantha Krieger, 1915
146. Xanthopimpla melanura Krieger, 1914
147. Xanthopimpla messelensis Spasojevic, Wedmann & Klopfstein, 2018
148. Xanthopimpla micracantha Townes & Chiu, 1970
149. Xanthopimpla microporus Townes & Chiu, 1970
150. Xanthopimpla mindorensis Townes & Chiu, 1970
151. Xanthopimpla minuta Cameron, 1905
152. Xanthopimpla mira Krieger, 1915
153. Xanthopimpla modesta (Smith, 1859)
154. Xanthopimpla mononyx Chao, 1997
155. Xanthopimpla mucronata Krieger, 1914
156. Xanthopimpla myosotis Townes & Chiu, 1970
157. Xanthopimpla naenia Morley, 1913
158. Xanthopimpla naevia Chao, 1997
159. Xanthopimpla nana Schulz, 1906
160. Xanthopimpla nanasiensis Ng & Idris, 2003
161. Xanthopimpla nanfenginus Wang, 1987
162. Xanthopimpla nigrifemur Townes & Chiu, 1970
163. Xanthopimpla nigripectus Townes & Chiu, 1970
164. Xanthopimpla nigritarsis Cameron, 1903
165. Xanthopimpla nipponensis Watanabe & Matsumoto, 2021
166. Xanthopimpla novemmacularis Huang & Wang, 1996
167. Xanthopimpla occidentalis Krieger, 1899
168. Xanthopimpla ochracea (Smith, 1858)
169. Xanthopimpla octonotata Krieger, 1899
170. Xanthopimpla octopunctata (Kriechbaumer, 1894)
171. Xanthopimpla oculata Townes & Chiu, 1970
172. Xanthopimpla ogovensis (Dalla Torre, 1901)
173. Xanthopimpla ornatipennis Cameron, 1911
174. Xanthopimpla pachymera Krieger, 1915
175. Xanthopimpla pallens Townes & Chiu, 1970
176. Xanthopimpla parvula Pisica, 1984
177. Xanthopimpla pasohensis Ng & Idris, 2004
178. Xanthopimpla pedator (Fabricius, 1775)
179. Xanthopimpla peruana Krieger, 1915
180. Xanthopimpla philippinensis Roman, 1913
181. Xanthopimpla pictifemur Townes & Chiu, 1970
182. Xanthopimpla platyura Townes & Chiu, 1970
183. Xanthopimpla pleuralis Cushman, 1925
184. Xanthopimpla pleuroschista Townes & Chiu, 1970
185. Xanthopimpla pleurosticta Townes & Chiu, 1970
186. Xanthopimpla politiora Townes & Chiu, 1970
187. Xanthopimpla polyspila Cameron, 1907
188. Xanthopimpla praeclara Spasojevic, Wedmann & Klopfstein, 2018
189. Xanthopimpla prolixa Townes & Chiu, 1970
190. Xanthopimpla proximans Townes & Chiu, 1970
191. Xanthopimpla pubidorsis Townes & Chiu, 1970
192. Xanthopimpla pucallpensis Gomez & Saaksjarvi
193. Xanthopimpla pulvinaris Townes & Chiu, 1970
194. Xanthopimpla pumilio Krieger, 1915
195. Xanthopimpla punctata (Fabricius, 1781)
196. Xanthopimpla punctidorsum Townes & Chiu, 1970
197. Xanthopimpla punctifrons Townes, 1973
198. Xanthopimpla punctulata Townes & Chiu, 1970
199. Xanthopimpla pusilla Krieger, 1915
200. Xanthopimpla pyramidalis Townes & Chiu, 1970
201. Xanthopimpla quadridens Townes & Chiu, 1970
202. Xanthopimpla quadrinotata Krieger, 1915
203. Xanthopimpla quadripunctata Saussure, 1892
204. Xanthopimpla quatei Townes & Chiu, 1970
205. Xanthopimpla rasilis Townes & Chiu, 1970
206. Xanthopimpla regina Morley, 1913
207. Xanthopimpla reicherti Krieger, 1914
208. Xanthopimpla rhabdomera Townes, 1969
209. Xanthopimpla rhopaloceros Krieger, 1915
210. Xanthopimpla rhyta Wang & Huang, 1993
211. Xanthopimpla romani Krieger, 1915
212. Xanthopimpla rupes Townes & Chiu, 1970
213. Xanthopimpla scamba Townes & Chiu, 1970
214. Xanthopimpla seorsicarina Wang, 1987
215. Xanthopimpla sexlineata Cameron, 1907
216. Xanthopimpla sicaria Krieger, 1915
217. Xanthopimpla sikkimensis Cameron, 1907
218. Xanthopimpla sparsa Townes & Chiu, 1970
219. Xanthopimpla spatula Townes & Chiu, 1970
220. Xanthopimpla spiloptera Krieger, 1915
221. Xanthopimpla splendens Krieger, 1899
222. Xanthopimpla stemmator (Thunberg, 1822)
223. Xanthopimpla stenophatna Krieger, 1915
224. Xanthopimpla sticta Townes & Chiu, 1970
225. Xanthopimpla striata Townes & Chiu, 1970
226. Xanthopimpla stulta Seyrig, 1932
227. Xanthopimpla subreicherti Wang & Huang, 1993
228. Xanthopimpla summervillei (Girault, 1926)
229. Xanthopimpla sylvicola Watanabe & Matsumoto, 2021
230. Xanthopimpla terebratrix Krieger, 1914
231. Xanthopimpla terminalis (Brulle, 1846)
232. Xanthopimpla tessmanni Krieger, 1915
233. Xanthopimpla thrinax Townes & Chiu, 1970
234. Xanthopimpla tonicae Townes & Chiu, 1970
235. Xanthopimpla townesi Chao, 1997
236. Xanthopimpla toxopei Townes & Chiu, 1970
237. Xanthopimpla trachypleuris Townes & Chiu, 1970
238. Xanthopimpla transmacula Wang & Huang, 1993
239. Xanthopimpla trias Townes & Chiu, 1970
240. Xanthopimpla tricapus Townes & Chiu, 1970
241. Xanthopimpla trichonotus Townes & Chiu, 1970
242. Xanthopimpla trifasciata (Smith, 1865)
243. Xanthopimpla trigonalis Szepligeti, 1908
244. Xanthopimpla trigonophatna Krieger, 1915
245. Xanthopimpla trimaculata (Smith, 1859)
246. Xanthopimpla triquetra Townes & Chiu, 1970
247. Xanthopimpla trisignata Krieger, 1899
248. Xanthopimpla trunca Krieger, 1915
249. Xanthopimpla unicolor (Smith, 1859)
250. Xanthopimpla varimaculata Cameron, 1907
251. Xanthopimpla varivittata Cameron, 1911
252. Xanthopimpla verrucula Townes & Chiu, 1970
253. Xanthopimpla verticalis Townes & Chiu, 1970
254. Xanthopimpla vidali Gomez
255. Xanthopimpla virescens Townes & Chiu, 1970
256. Xanthopimpla virgipes Townes & Chiu, 1970
257. Xanthopimpla walshae Townes & Chiu, 1970
258. Xanthopimpla xystra Townes & Chiu, 1970
259. Xanthopimpla yoshimurai Watanabe & Matsumoto, 2021
260. Xanthopimpla zhejiangensis Chao, 1980
