= Chilo dailingensis =

Scientific classification
- Kingdom: Animalia
- Phylum: Arthropoda
- Class: Insecta
- Order: Lepidoptera
- Family: Crambidae
- Genus: Chilo
- Species: C. dailingensis

Binomial name
- Chilo dailingensis Wang & Sung, 1981

Species of moth

Chilo dailingensis is a moth in the family Crambidae. It was described by Wang and Sung in 1981. It is found in China (Heilongjiang).
