= Chilo prophylactes =

Scientific classification
- Kingdom: Animalia
- Phylum: Arthropoda
- Class: Insecta
- Order: Lepidoptera
- Family: Crambidae
- Genus: Chilo
- Species: C. prophylactes

Binomial name
- Chilo prophylactes Meyrick, 1934

Species of moth

Chilo prophylactes is a moth in the family Crambidae. It was described by Edward Meyrick in 1934. It is found in the Democratic Republic of the Congo and South Africa.
