= Chilo batri =

Scientific classification
- Domain: Eukaryota
- Kingdom: Animalia
- Phylum: Arthropoda
- Class: Insecta
- Order: Lepidoptera
- Family: Crambidae
- Genus: Chilo
- Species: C. batri

Binomial name
- Chilo batri (T. B. Fletcher, 1928)

Synonyms
- Diatraea batri T. B. Fletcher, 1928

Species of moth

Chilo batri is a moth in the family Crambidae. It was described by Thomas Bainbrigge Fletcher in 1928. It is found in India.
