= Chilo ceylonica =

Scientific classification
- Kingdom: Animalia
- Phylum: Arthropoda
- Class: Insecta
- Order: Lepidoptera
- Family: Crambidae
- Genus: Chilo
- Species: C. ceylonica

Binomial name
- Chilo ceylonica Hampson, 1896

Synonyms
- Chilo torquatellus de Joannis, 1930

Species of moth

Chilo ceylonica is a moth in the family Crambidae. It was described by George Hampson in 1896. It is found in Sri Lanka, Vietnam and Hainan, China.

== Description ==
The wingspan is about 22 mm in the male and 26 mm in the female. It is an ochreous-brown moth with fuscous irrorations (speckles). Forewings with fuscous irroration forming streaks in the interspaces except on inner margin. There is an indistinct fulvous medial line curved below costa and with silvery scales on its edges. A submarginal silver line bent inwards below costa. A marginal black spots series found with white center. Cilia silvery. Hindwings whitish, tinged with fuscous on apical area on male. An indistinct marginal black specks series can be seen.
