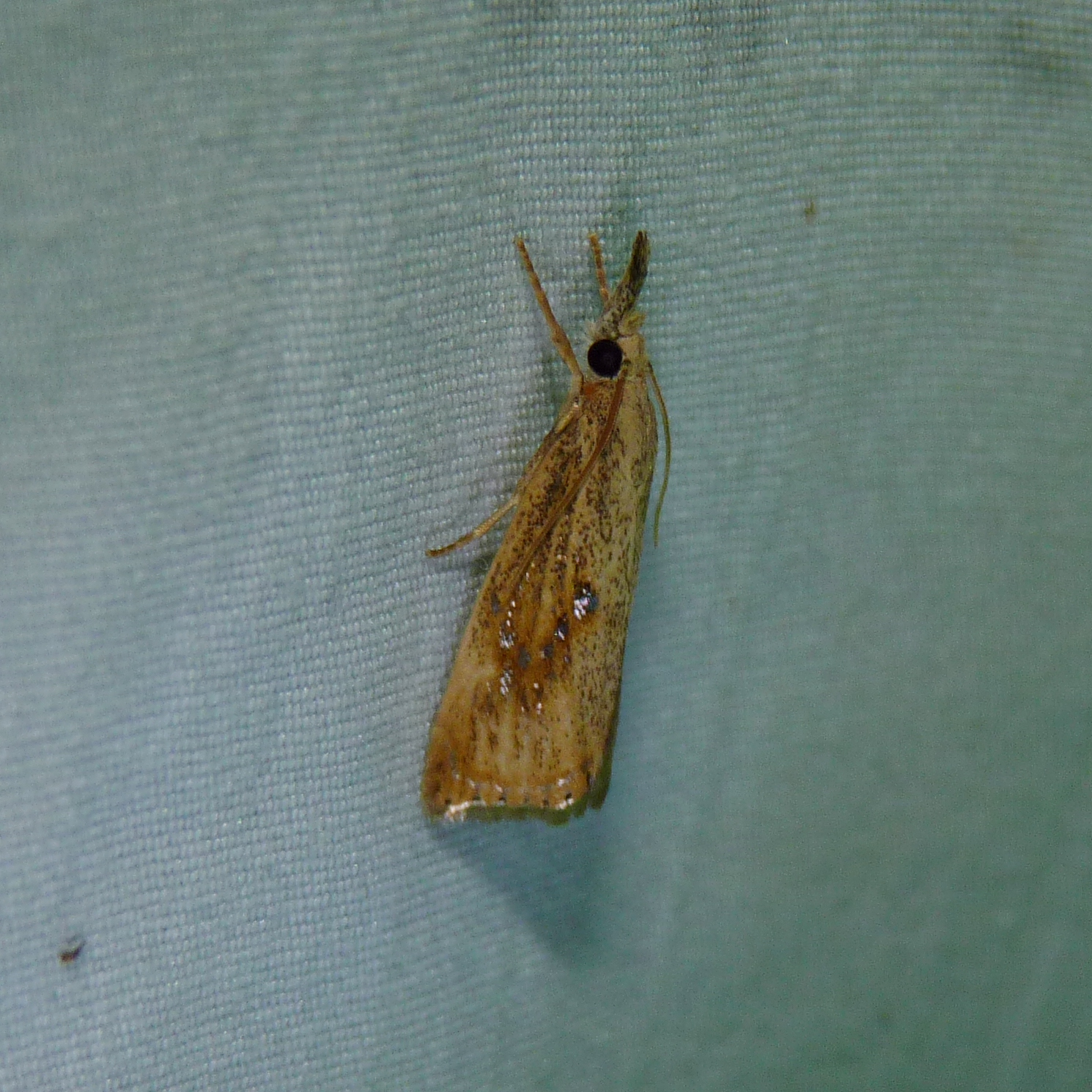

Scientific classification
- Domain: Eukaryota
- Kingdom: Animalia
- Phylum: Arthropoda
- Class: Insecta
- Order: Lepidoptera
- Family: Crambidae
- Genus: Chilo
- Species: C. plejadellus

Binomial name
- Chilo plejadellus Zincken, 1821

Synonyms
- Chilo oryzaeellus C. V. Riley, 1882; Chilo oryzeellus Munroe, 1995; Diphryx prolatella Grote, 1881; Jartheza sabulifera Walker, 1863

= Chilo plejadellus =

Species of moth

Chilo plejadellus, the rice stalk borer moth, is a moth in the family Crambidae described by Johann Leopold Theodor Friedrich Zincken in 1821. It is found in North America, including Illinois, Ontario, Quebec, Pennsylvania, Georgia, Louisiana, Wisconsin, Texas and Arkansas.

The wingspan is 20–40 mm. They reach a length of 25–40 mm.
