= Chilo orichalcociliella =

Scientific classification
- Domain: Eukaryota
- Kingdom: Animalia
- Phylum: Arthropoda
- Class: Insecta
- Order: Lepidoptera
- Family: Crambidae
- Genus: Chilo
- Species: C. orichalcociliella

Binomial name
- Chilo orichalcociliella (Strand, 1911)

Synonyms
- Diatraea orichalcociliella Strand, 1911; Diatraea argyrolepia Hampson, 1919; Chilo orichalocociliellus Pinhey, 1975

Species of moth

Chilo orichalcociliella is a moth in the family Crambidae. It was described by Strand in 1911. It is found in Ghana, Kenya, Madagascar, Malawi, Mozambique, South Africa and Tanzania.

The larvae have been recorded feeding on Zea mays and Sorghum species.
