= Chilo ikri =

Scientific classification
- Domain: Eukaryota
- Kingdom: Animalia
- Phylum: Arthropoda
- Class: Insecta
- Order: Lepidoptera
- Family: Crambidae
- Genus: Chilo
- Species: C. ikri

Binomial name
- Chilo ikri (T. B. Fletcher, 1928)

Synonyms
- Diatraea ikri T. B. Fletcher, 1928

Species of moth

Chilo ikri is a moth in the family Crambidae. It was described by Thomas Bainbrigge Fletcher in 1928. It is found in India.
