= Chilo pulverata =

Scientific classification
- Domain: Eukaryota
- Kingdom: Animalia
- Phylum: Arthropoda
- Class: Insecta
- Order: Lepidoptera
- Family: Crambidae
- Genus: Chilo
- Species: C. pulverata

Binomial name
- Chilo pulverata (Wileman & South, 1917)

Synonyms
- Diatraea pulverata Wileman & South, 1917; Chilo pulveratus; Chilo izuensis Okano, 1962; Chilo izouensis Bleszynski, 1965

Species of moth

Chilo pulverata is a moth in the family Crambidae. It was described by Wileman and South in 1917. It is found in Taiwan, Japan, China and the Philippines, as well as on Timor and Sumatra.
