= Chilo argyropasta =

Scientific classification
- Kingdom: Animalia
- Phylum: Arthropoda
- Class: Insecta
- Order: Lepidoptera
- Family: Crambidae
- Genus: Chilo
- Species: C. argyropasta

Binomial name
- Chilo argyropasta (Hampson, 1919)

Synonyms
- Argyria argyropasta Hampson, 1919; Diatraea argentisparsalis Hampson, 1919; Diatraea argentisparsalis var. fuscata Janse, 1922; Diatraea argentisparsalis var. pallidifascia Janse, 1922

Species of moth

Chilo argyropasta is a moth in the family Crambidae. It was described by George Hampson in 1919. It is found in Malawi, South Africa and Zimbabwe.
