= Chilo demotellus =

Scientific classification
- Kingdom: Animalia
- Phylum: Arthropoda
- Class: Insecta
- Order: Lepidoptera
- Family: Crambidae
- Genus: Chilo
- Species: C. demotellus

Binomial name
- Chilo demotellus Walker, 1866

Synonyms
- Chilo fernaldalis Dyar & Heinrich, 1927; Diatraea idalis Fernald, 1896

Species of moth

Chilo demotellus is a moth in the family Crambidae. It was described by Francis Walker in 1866. It is found in North America, where it has been recorded from Georgia, Maryland, New Jersey and South Carolina.

The wingspan is about 26 mm. Adults have been recorded on wing from April to August.
