= Chilo zizaniae =

Scientific classification
- Domain: Eukaryota
- Kingdom: Animalia
- Phylum: Arthropoda
- Class: Insecta
- Order: Lepidoptera
- Family: Crambidae
- Genus: Chilo
- Species: C. zizaniae

Binomial name
- Chilo zizaniae Wang & Sung, 1981

Species of insect

Chilo zizaniae is a moth in the family Crambidae. It was described by Wang and Sung in 1981. It is found in China (Hubei).
