= Chilo diffusilinea =

Scientific classification
- Domain: Eukaryota
- Kingdom: Animalia
- Phylum: Arthropoda
- Class: Insecta
- Order: Lepidoptera
- Family: Crambidae
- Genus: Chilo
- Species: C. diffusilinea

Binomial name
- Chilo diffusilinea (de Joannis, 1927)

Synonyms
- Diatraea diffusilinea de Joannis, 1927; Chilo phaeosema E. L. Martin, 1958

Species of moth

Chilo diffusilinea is a moth in the family Crambidae. It was described by Joseph de Joannis in 1927. It is found in Malawi, Mozambique, Tanzania and Zimbabwe.
