= Chilo pulverosellus =

Scientific classification
- Kingdom: Animalia
- Phylum: Arthropoda
- Class: Insecta
- Order: Lepidoptera
- Family: Crambidae
- Genus: Chilo
- Species: C. pulverosellus

Binomial name
- Chilo pulverosellus Ragonot, 1895

Synonyms
- Chilo brevipalpellus Zerny, 1914; Chilo lemarchandellus D. Lucas, 1945; Eschata fernandezi de Joannis, 1932

Species of moth

Chilo pulverosellus is a species of moth in the family Crambidae described by Émile Louis Ragonot in 1895. It is found across southern Europe, France, as well as in the Levant region, and in the region of Transcaspia.

The forewing length is around 11–13 mm. Adults have wings from May to September. There are probably two or three generations per year.

The larvae feed on corn.
