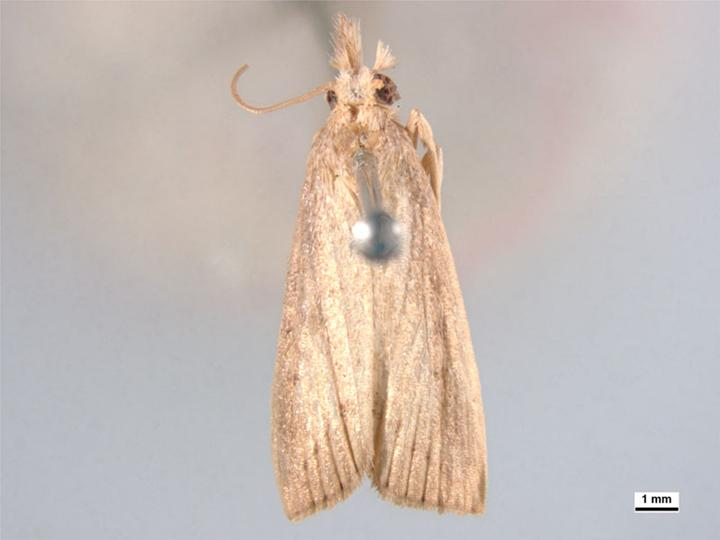

Scientific classification
- Domain: Eukaryota
- Kingdom: Animalia
- Phylum: Arthropoda
- Class: Insecta
- Order: Lepidoptera
- Family: Crambidae
- Genus: Chilo
- Species: C. terrenellus

Binomial name
- Chilo terrenellus Pagenstecher, 1900

Synonyms
- Chilotraea terrenellus

= Chilo terrenellus =

Species of moth

Chilo terrenellus, the sugarcane borer, is a species of moth of the family Crambidae. It was described by Arnold Pagenstecher in 1900 and is found in Papua New Guinea and islands in the Torres Strait.

The larvae feed on sugarcane.
