= Chilo luteellus =

Scientific classification
- Domain: Eukaryota
- Kingdom: Animalia
- Phylum: Arthropoda
- Class: Insecta
- Order: Lepidoptera
- Family: Crambidae
- Genus: Chilo
- Species: C. luteellus

Binomial name
- Chilo luteellus (Motschulsky, 1866)

Synonyms
- Schoenobius luteellus Motschulsky, 1866; Chilo boxanus E. Hering, 1903; Chilo concolorellus Christoph, 1885; Chilo dubia Bethune-Baker, 1894; Chilo gensanellus Leech, 1889; Chilo molydellus Zerny in Osthelder, 1935; Chilo plumbosellus Chrétien, 1910; Chilo pseudoplumbellus Caradja, 1932; Chilo lutellus Hampson, 1896; Chilo molybdellus Osthelder, 1941

Species of moth

Chilo luteellus is a species of moth in the family Crambidae described by Victor Motschulsky in 1866. It is found in France, Spain, Italy, Denmark, Hungary, Romania, Bulgaria, Greece, Algeria, Egypt, Transcaspia, Syria, Iran, China, Korea, Japan and the Philippines.

The length of the forewings is 13–18 mm.

The larvae feed on Phragmites communis.
