= Chilo psammathis =

Scientific classification
- Kingdom: Animalia
- Phylum: Arthropoda
- Class: Insecta
- Order: Lepidoptera
- Family: Crambidae
- Genus: Chilo
- Species: C. psammathis

Binomial name
- Chilo psammathis (Hampson, 1919)

Synonyms
- Argyria psammathis Hampson, 1919; Diatraea perpulverea Hampson, 1919

Species of moth

Chilo psammathis is a moth in the family Crambidae. It was described by George Hampson in 1919. It is found in Ghana and Nigeria.
