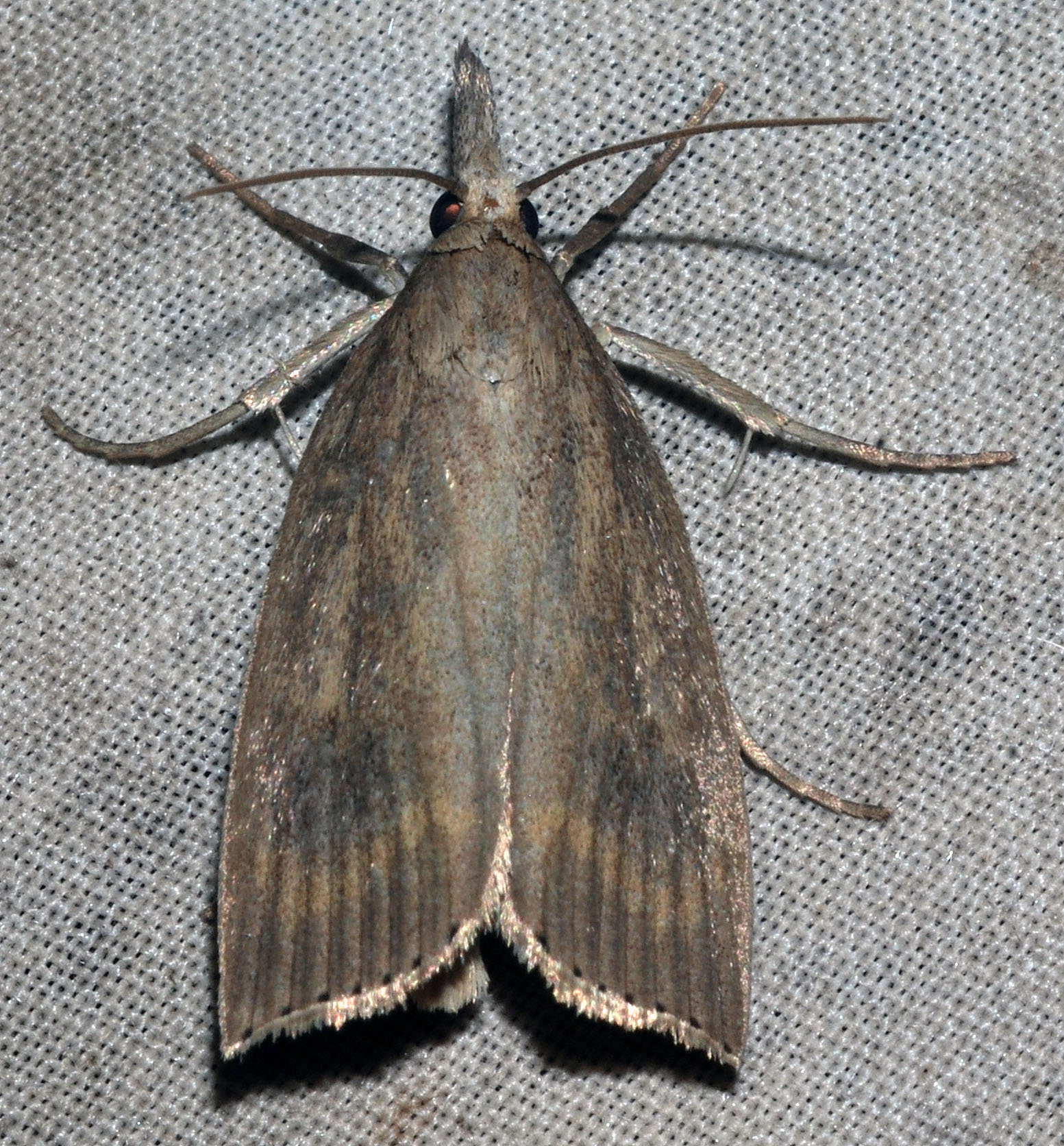

Scientific classification
- Domain: Eukaryota
- Kingdom: Animalia
- Phylum: Arthropoda
- Class: Insecta
- Order: Lepidoptera
- Family: Crambidae
- Genus: Chilo
- Species: C. erianthalis

Binomial name
- Chilo erianthalis Capps, 1963

= Chilo erianthalis =

Species of moth

Chilo erianthalis is a moth in the family Crambidae. It was described by Hahn William Capps in 1963. It is found in North America, having been recorded in Georgia, Florida and South Carolina. It is also found in the West Indies.

The larvae feed on Saccharum species and probably other Gramineae species.
