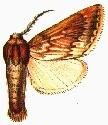
- Sesamia rubritincta

Scientific classification
- Domain: Eukaryota
- Kingdom: Animalia
- Phylum: Arthropoda
- Class: Insecta
- Order: Lepidoptera
- Superfamily: Noctuoidea
- Family: Noctuidae
- Tribe: Apameini
- Genus: Sesamia; Guenée in Boisduval & Guenée, 1852

Synonyms
- Microsemyra Butler, 1883; Conicophoria Matsumura, 1929

= Sesamia =

Genus of moths

Sesamia is a genus of moths of the family Noctuidae erected by Achille Guenée in 1852. Most but not all of its species are Afrotropical in distribution, with a preference for humid, open habitats. Larvae are stemborers, and several species of Sesamia are known agricultural pests on cereals, such as Sesamia calamistis, the African pink stemborer, and Sesamia inferens, the Asiatic pink stemborer.

== Species ==
- Sesamia albicolor Janse, 1939
- Sesamia albivena Hampson, 1902
- Sesamia arfaki Bethune-baker, 1910
- Sesamia atlantica Boursin, 1944
- Sesamia bombiformis Wallengren, 1860
- Sesamia botanephaga Tams & Bowden, 1953
- Sesamia calamistis Hampson, 1910
- Sesamia celebensis Roepke, 1938
- Sesamia confusa (Sugi, 1982)
- Sesamia coniota Hampson, 1902
- Sesamia cretica Lederer, 1857
- Sesamia epunctifera Hampson, 1902
- Sesamia excelsa Laporte, 1976
- Sesamia fuscifrontia Hampson, 1914
- Sesamia geyri (Strand, 1915)
- Sesamia griselda Warren, 1913
- Sesamia grisescens Warren, 1911
- Sesamia hemiparacta Wileman & West, 1929
- Sesamia ilonae Hacker, 2002
- Sesamia incerta (Walker, 1856)
- Sesamia inferens (Walker, 1856)
- Sesamia jansei Tams & Bowden, 1953
- Sesamia madagascariensis Saalmüller, 1891
- Sesamia melianoides Rothshild, 1915
- Sesamia mesosticha D. S. Fletcher, 1961
- Sesamia monodi Rungs, 1963
- Sesamia nigritarsis Hampson, 1914
- Sesamia nigropunctata (Wileman, 1912)
- Sesamia nonagrioides (Lefèbvre, 1827)
- Sesamia oriaula Tams & Bowden, 1953
- Sesamia pallida (Butler, 1883)
- Sesamia penniseti Tams & Bowden, 1953
- Sesamia plagiographa D. S. Fletcher, 1961
- Sesamia poebora Tams & Bowden, 1953
- Sesamia poephaga Tams & Bowden, 1953
- Sesamia pseudoturpis Kononenko & Ahn, 1998
- Sesamia punctilinea (Wileman, 1912)
- Sesamia punctivena (Wileman, 1814)
- Sesamia roseoflammatra Pinhey, 1956
- Sesamia royi Laporte, 1973
- Sesamia rubritincta Hampson, 1902
- Sesamia rufescens Hampson, 1910
- Sesamia rungsi Boursin, 1957
- Sesamia sabulosa Hampson, 1910
- Sesamia sciagrapha D. S. Fletcher, 1961
- Sesamia steniptera Hampson, 1914
- Sesamia stictica Berio, 1976
- Sesamia submarginalis (Hampson, 1891)
- Sesamia sylvata Janse, 1939
- Sesamia taenioleuca (Wallengren, 1863)
- Sesamia tosta Snellen, 1872
- Sesamia turpis (Butler, 1879)
- Sesamia uniformis (Dudgeon, 1905)
- Sesamia vanharteni Hacker & Fibiger, 2002
- Sesamia viettei Rungs, 1954
- Sesamia wiltshirei Rungs, 1963
