= Sesamia calamistis =

Scientific classification
- Kingdom: Animalia
- Phylum: Arthropoda
- Class: Insecta
- Order: Lepidoptera
- Superfamily: Noctuoidea
- Family: Noctuidae
- Genus: Sesamia
- Species: S. calamistis

Binomial name
- Sesamia calamistis Hampson, 1910

Species of moth

Sesamia calamistis, the African pink stem borer, is a moth of the family Noctuidae.

It is distributed throughout sub-Saharan Africa and on Indian Ocean islands.

The larvae are agricultural pests that affect rice, maize, sorghum, and sugarcane crops. They have been recorded feeding on pearl millet and other grass species crops in the Ivory Coast and other parts of West Africa.

== See also ==
- Sesamia inferens, the Asiatic pink stem borer
