= Chilo sacchariphagus =

Scientific classification
- Domain: Eukaryota
- Kingdom: Animalia
- Phylum: Arthropoda
- Class: Insecta
- Order: Lepidoptera
- Family: Crambidae
- Genus: Chilo
- Species: C. sacchariphagus

Binomial name
- Chilo sacchariphagus (Bojer, 1856)

Synonyms
- Procera sacchariphagus Bojer, 1856; Borer saccharellus Guenée, 1862; Chilo mauriciellus Walker, 1863; Diatraea striatalis Snellen, 1891; Chilo venosatus Walker, 1863; Argyria straminella Caradja, 1926; Proceras sacchariphagus indicus Kapur, 1950; Argyria sacchariphagus stramineella Caradja, 1926

Species of moth

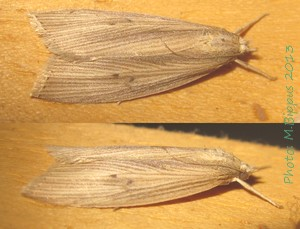
Chilo sacchariphagus sacchariphagus

Chilo sacchariphagus, the spotted borer, is a moth of the family Crambidae. It was described by Wenceslas Bojer in 1856 and was originally found in South and South-East Asia, where there are three subspecies:

- C. sacchariphagus sacchariphagus in Malaysia, Indonesia, Indian Ocean
- C. sacchariphagus indicus in India
- C. sacchariphagus stramineellus in the south of China, Taiwan

The larvae are a major pest to sugar cane.

In 1850 Chilo sacchariphagus sacchariphagus had been introduced in sugarcane setts from Java to Mauritius, around 1855 also to the neighbouring island Réunion. Its presence is also confirmed in Madagascar and Comores. In 1999 the first presence on the African continent was confirmed in sugar estates in Mafambisse, Mozambique and in 2001 also in Marromeu.

== Biological control ==
In attempting its biological control, the Mauritian government had introduced 31 species of parasitoids. Only two became established (Trichogramma australicum and Cotesia flavipes).
