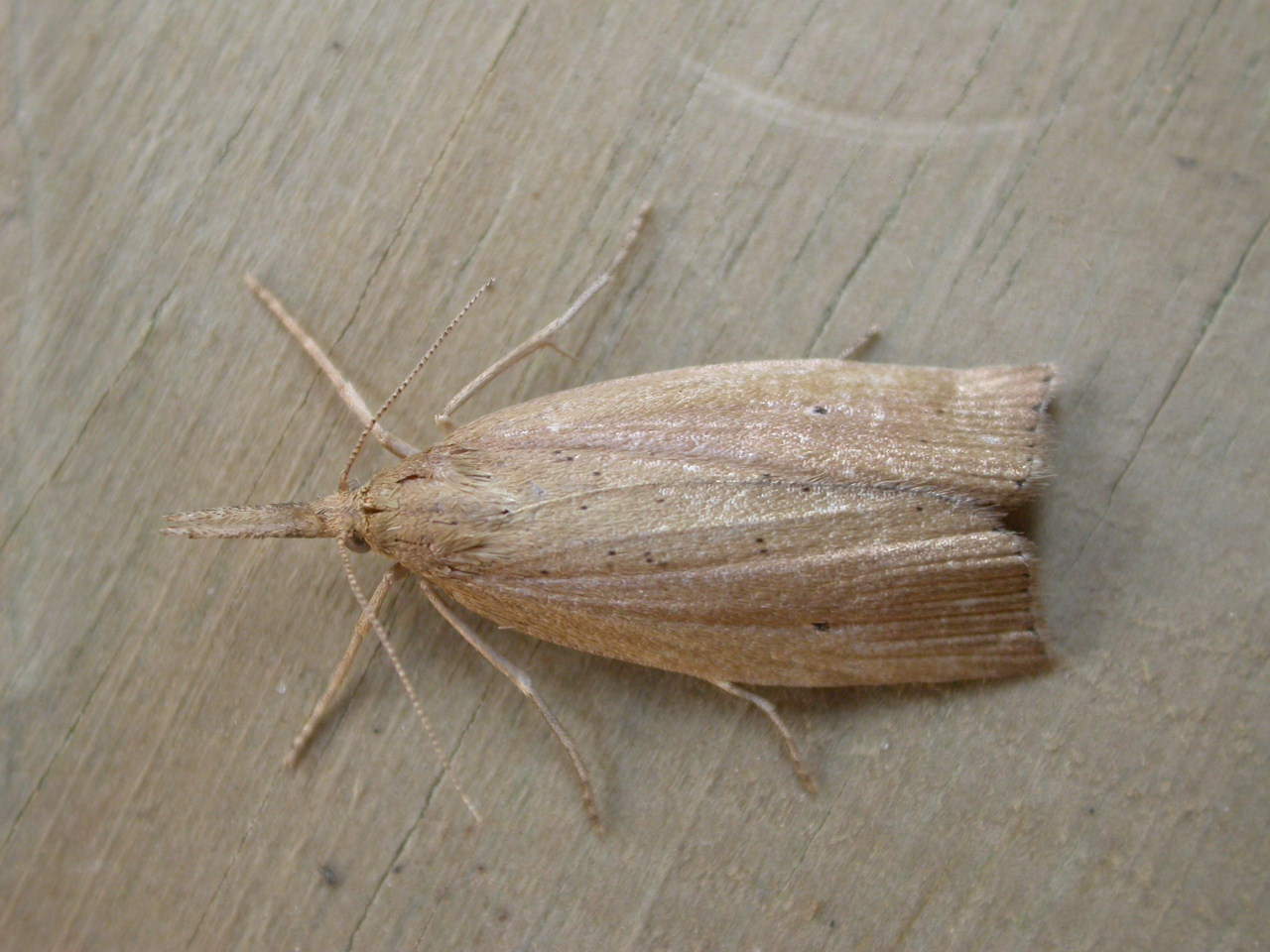
- Chilo phragmitella

Scientific classification
- Domain: Eukaryota
- Kingdom: Animalia
- Phylum: Arthropoda
- Class: Insecta
- Order: Lepidoptera
- Family: Crambidae
- Tribe: Chiloini
- Genus: Chilo; Zincken, 1817

Synonyms
- Borer Guenée, 1862; Chilona Sodoffsky, 1837; Chilotraea Kapur, 1950; Diphryx Grote, 1881; Hypiesta Hampson, 1919; Nephalia Turner, 1911; Silveria Dyar, 1925

= Chilo (moth) =

Genus of moths

Chilo is a genus of moths of the family Crambidae. Some of these moths are called borers.

== Description ==
The proboscis is absent. Palpi porrect (extended forward), clothes with rough hair, and extending from two and a half to three lengths of the head. Maxillary palp dilated with scales at extremity. Frons with a conical projection. Antennae minutely serrate and ciliated. Tibia with outer spurs about two-thirds length of inner. Forewings with the apex rectangular in male, typically acute and produced in female. Vein 3 from before angle of cell and veins 4 and 5 well separated at origin. Vein 7 straight and well separated from veins 8 and 9. Vein 10 free, whereas vein 11 curved and approximated to vein 12. Hindwings with vein 3 from near angle of cell. Veins 4 and 5 from angle and veins 6 and 7 from upper angle.

== Species ==
- Chilo agamemnon Błeszyński, 1962
- Chilo aleniella (Strand, 1913)
- Chilo argyrogramma Hampson, 1919
- Chilo argyropasta (Hampson, 1919)
- Chilo auricilius Dudgeon, 1905
- Chilo bandra (Kapur, 1950)
- Chilo batri (T. B. Fletcher, 1928)
- Chilo ceylonica Hampson, 1896
- Chilo chiriquitensis (Zeller, 1877)
- Chilo christophi Błeszyński, 1965
- Chilo cinnamomellus Berg, 1875
- Chilo costifusalis (Hampson, 1919)
- Chilo crypsimetalla (Turner, 1911)
- Chilo dailingensis Wang & Sung, 1981
- Chilo demotellus Walker, 1866
- Chilo diffusilinea (de Joannis, 1927)
- Chilo erianthalis Capps, 1963
- Chilo flavirufalis (Hampson, 1919)
- Chilo heracleus Zeller, 1877
- Chilo ikri (T. B. Fletcher, 1928)
- Chilo incerta (Sjöstedt, 1926)
- Chilo infuscatellus Snellen, 1890
- Chilo ingloriellus Möschler, 1882
- Chilo kanra (T. B. Fletcher, 1928)
- Chilo leucealis (Marion, 1957)
- Chilo ingulatellus Wang & Sung, 1981
- Chilo louisiadalis (Hampson, 1919)
- Chilo luniferalis Hampson, 1896
- Chilo luteellus (Motschulsky 1866)
- Chilo mercatorius Błeszyński, 1970
- Chilo mesoplagalis (Hampson, 1919)
- Chilo niponella (Thunberg, 1788)
- Chilo orichalcociliella (Strand, 1911)
- Chilo panici Wang & Sung, 1981
- Chilo partellus (Swinhoe, 1885)
- Chilo perfusalis (Hampson, 1919)
- Chilo phragmitella (Hübner, 1805)
- Chilo plejadellus Zincken, 1821
- Chilo polychrysus (Meyrick, 1932)
- Chilo prophylactes Meyrick, 1934
- Chilo psammathis (Hampson, 1919)
- Chilo pulverata (Wileman & South, 1917)
- Chilo pulverosellus Ragonot 1895
- Chilo quirimbellus Błeszyński, 1970
- Chilo recalvus (Wallengren, 1876)
- Chilo sacchariphagus (Bojer et al., 1856)
- Chilo spatiosellus Möschler, 1882
- Chilo subbivittalis (Gaede, 1917)
- Chilo suppressalis (Walker, 1860)
- Chilo tamsi Kapur, 1950
- Chilo terrenellus Pagenstecher, 1900
- Chilo thyrsis Błeszyński, 1963
- Chilo tumidicostalis (Hampson, 1919)
- Chilo vergilius Błeszyński, 1970
- Chilo yichunensis Wang & Sung, 1981
- Chilo zacconius Błeszyński, 1970
- Chilo zizaniae Wang & Sung, 1981
- Chilo zoriandellus Błeszyński, 1970

== Status unclear ==
- Chilo decrepitellus Zincken, 1821 [nomen oblitum], described from Germany

== Former species ==
- Chilo williami (de Joannis, 1927)
