= Chilo thyrsis =

Scientific classification
- Kingdom: Animalia
- Phylum: Arthropoda
- Class: Insecta
- Order: Lepidoptera
- Family: Crambidae
- Genus: Chilo
- Species: C. thyrsis

Binomial name
- Chilo thyrsis Błeszyński, 1963

Species of moth

Chilo thyrsis is a moth in the family Crambidae. It was described by Stanisław Błeszyński in 1963. It is found in Tanzania.

The larvae have been reported feeding on Zea mays.
