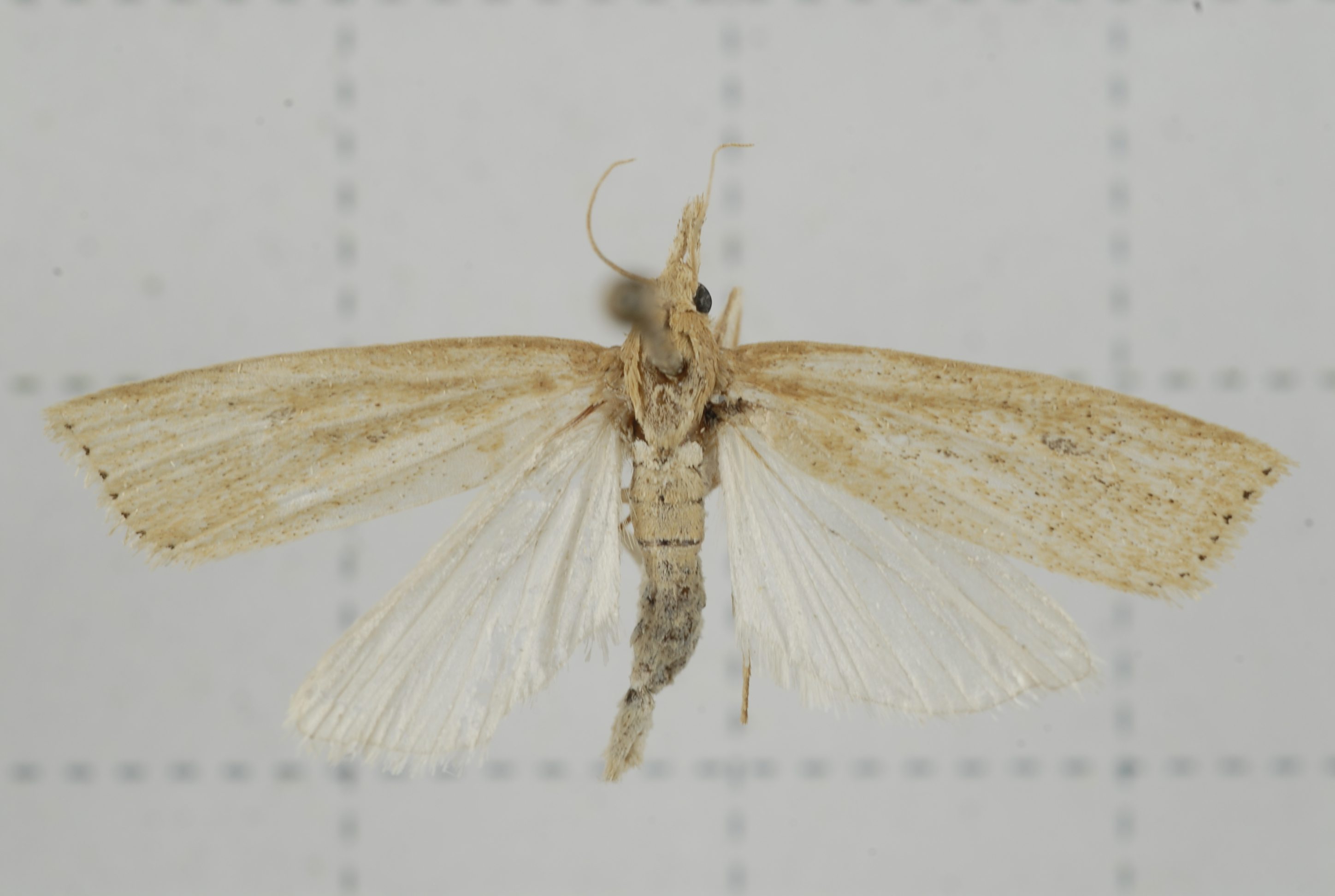

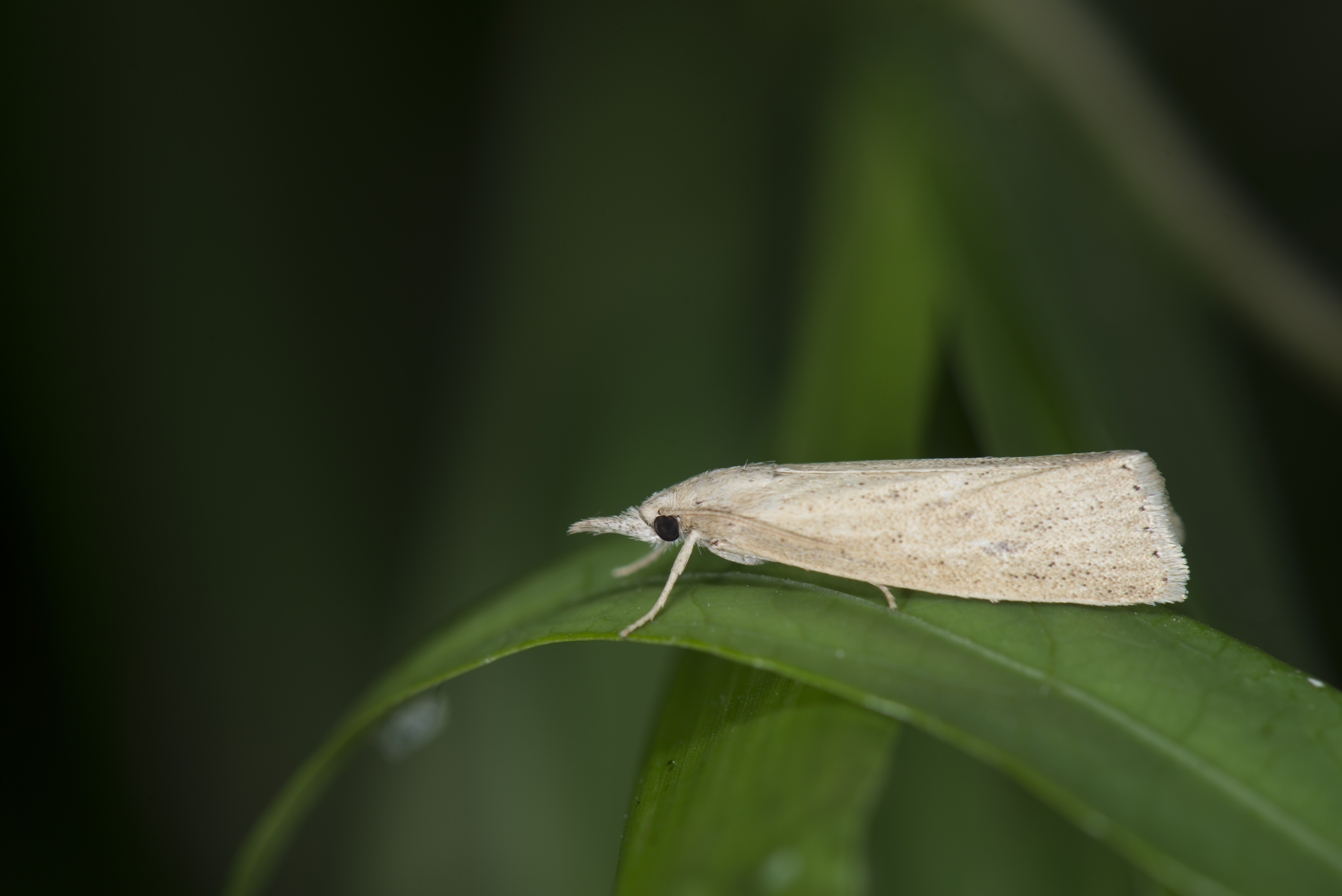

Scientific classification
- Kingdom: Animalia
- Phylum: Arthropoda
- Class: Insecta
- Order: Lepidoptera
- Family: Crambidae
- Genus: Chilo
- Species: C. suppressalis

Binomial name
- Chilo suppressalis (Walker, 1863)

Synonyms
- Crambus suppressalis Walker, 1863; Jartheza simplex Butler, 1880; Chilo simplex; Chilo oryzae T. B. Fletcher, 1928

= Chilo suppressalis =

Asiatic rice borer

Species of moth

Chilo suppressalis, the Asiatic rice borer or striped rice stemborer, is a moth of the family Crambidae. It is a widespread species, known from Iran, India, Sri Lanka, China, eastern Asia, Japan, Taiwan, Malaysia to the Pacific.

It is a serious pest of rice. They are largely responsible for the great reduction in the rice growing in East Asia, India and Indonesia. It was probably introduced in Spain and Hawaii by humans, where it is widely spread towards Northern Territory of Australia.

== Description ==
The wingspan is 18 mm in male and 18–20 mm in female. In the male, the head and thorax are brown and white. Abdomen pale. Forewings with somewhat acute apex which is ochreous, wholly suffused with brown except a patch in cell and a streak below medial nervure. Inner margin whitish. A sinuous rufous medial line runs with silvery spots on its inner side, also on discocellulars, and below vein 2. A rufous submarginal line, highly angled at vein 6 and with silvery line on its outer edge. A marginal series of black specks found. Cilia rufous. Hindwings whitish.

In the female, it is much more orange-fulvous coloured. Forewings irrorated (sprinkled) with brown. Medial and submarginal lines almost obsolete. The silvery spots below the cell prominent and sometimes double. The postmedial area irrorated with silvery scales.

== Ecology and life cycle ==
Eggs are scale like and translucent white to dark yellow. These naked clusters consist of nearly 60 overlapping rows.

First-instar larvae are greyish white with a black head. Head capsule gradually turns brown towards final stages. Full-grown larvae are yellow.

Apart from the major food plant, rice, larvae also feed on wide array of plants such as Gigantochloa verticellata, Echinochloa crusgalli cruspavonis, Echinochloa stagnina, Eleusine indica, Panicum sp., Paspalum conjugatum, Amaranthus sp., Phragmites australis, Raphanus raphanistrum, Sclerostachya fusca, Sorghum sp., Typha latifolia, Xanthium strumarium, and Zizania aquatica.

Pupation takes place in a stem of the food plant. Pupae are reddish brown with two ribbed crest on the pronotal margins. Several spines are located in the cremaster on the last abdominal segment.

There are two different populations of rice stem borer, one associated with rice and the other with Water Oats (Zizania latifolia). Biological differences between these populations, including the time at which mating occurs, which suggested that there may be cryptic species. Genetic analyses have indicated, however, that there is gene flow between these host-associated populations.

== Attack ==
They bore the stems of their host plants, and therefore are classified as rice stem borers.

Almost all plant parts, from twigs, leaves, stems are attacked. Caterpillars can be largely internal feeders, whereas adults are external sap feeders. Heavily attacked plants can show varying symptoms from dead heart, white heads, dwarfing, stunting, rot, abnormal forms, and rosetting. Finally the whole plant will die. Dead hearts are the most obvious field symptoms.

== Prevention ==
The pest should diagnosed early in the symptoms, unless it is not worthy to protect the cultivation. Many traditional and agricultural practices like flooding and harrowing or ploughing to turn in stubble and straw are effective to prevent pests in the next growing season. The use of early-maturing varieties and at harvest, planting synchronization and stem removal close to ground is managed.

Biologically, they can easily removed by usage of tachinid Paratheresia claripalpis, which is extensively practiced in Malaysia. The ichneumonid Eriborus sinicus is also used in Asia and Hawaii.

Planting highly resistant varieties of rice and transgenic plants is also known to reduce the attack of these pests.
