= Bissetia (moth) =

Scientific classification
- Domain: Eukaryota
- Kingdom: Animalia
- Phylum: Arthropoda
- Class: Insecta
- Order: Lepidoptera
- Family: Crambidae
- Subfamily: Crambinae
- Tribe: Haimbachiini
- Genus: Bissetia; Kapur, 1950

Synonyms
- Girdharia Kapur, 1950

Genus of moths

Bissetia is a genus of moths of the family Crambidae.

== Species ==
- Bissetia leucomeralis (Hampson, 1919)
- Bissetia poliella (Hampson, 1919)
- Bissetia steniellus (Hampson, 1899)
- Bissetia subfumalis (Hampson, 1896)
- Bissetia tauromma (Kapur, 1950)
