= Chilo infuscatellus =

Scientific classification
- Domain: Eukaryota
- Kingdom: Animalia
- Phylum: Arthropoda
- Class: Insecta
- Order: Lepidoptera
- Family: Crambidae
- Genus: Chilo
- Species: C. infuscatellus

Binomial name
- Chilo infuscatellus Snellen, 1890

Synonyms
- Argyria coniorta Hampson, 1919; Argyria sticticraspis Hampson, 1919; Chilo tadzhikiellus Gerasimov, 1949; Diatraea calamina Hampson, 1919; Diatraea shariinensis Eguchi, 1933

Species of moth

Chilo infuscatellus, the yellow top borer or sugarcane shoot borer, is a moth in the family Crambidae. It was described by the Dutch entomologist Samuel Constantinus Snellen van Vollenhoven in 1890. It is found in India, Myanmar, Tajikistan, Afghanistan, Korea, Taiwan, Malaysia, the Philippines and on Java and Timor.

== Description ==
The adult moth has a body length of 30 to 40 mm (1 1/8 to 1 5/8 in). The hindwings are creamy white with pale, buff tips.

== Host plants ==
The larvae feed on a number of large plants in the grass family Poaceae; these include oats (Avena sativa), citronella grass (Cymbopogon winterianus), Bermuda grass (Cynodon dactylon), Java grass (Cyperus rotundus), jungle rice (Echinochloa colona), barley (Hordeum vulgare), rice (Oryza sativa), millet (Panicum), pearl millet (Pennisetum glaucum), sugarcane (Saccharum officinarum), sorghum (Sorghum bicolor) and maize (Zea mays). Young larvae eat small holes in the leaves, particularly the leaf sheaths. As they grow, the larvae feed on the tips of the shoots, killing the growing points, and later still, they bore into the stems, creating galleries and producing frass which drops from the holes. The stems become brittle and the dead hearts of the plants are characteristic of this pest.

== Control ==
Control of Chilo infuscatellus in sugar plantations is difficult. The plants are large and occupy the site for two or more years and insecticides are not normally practicable. A number of natural enemies can reduce the damage done by this pest; these include the tiny wasps of the genera Trichogramma and Telenomus, the egg parasitoid Cotesia flavipes, the fly Sturmiopsis inferens, various egg predators and the granulosis virus. Destruction of dead plant material at the end of the growing season and the elimination of wild grasses can also be helpful. Adjusting planting dates and various cultural techniques have been used with varying degrees of success.

Biological pest control through introduction of tachinid flies from Africa and the Caribbean has been attempted, but those flies have failed to become established. Another fly, Sturmiopsis inferens, is a naturally occurring parasitoid of this moth in India and it has been successfully used as a biological control agent. Trichogramma species have also been released experimentally but the results have been variable and inconsistent. Other integrated pest control methods that have met with success include spraying the crop with granulosis virus, releasing Trichogramma chilonis, releasing Cotesia flavipes and mechanical control with removal and destruction of egg masses. By these means the incidence of the pest can be reduced to a low level. Intercropping can be part of an integrated pest management plan, with the sugarcane pest's natural enemies being attracted by the planting of such crops as buckwheat, the flowers of which provide nectar to the adult parasitic insects and increase their fitness to breed. Good results have been obtained from intercropping sugarcane with soybean, okra, coriander and green beans, all of which proved attractive to the egg parasitoids and reduced prevalence of C. infuscatellus.

Arvinth et al 2010 insert Cry1Ab along with a very constitutive promoter – the maize polyubiquitin promoter – to protect against C. infuscatellus. They use both the Arencibia et al 1988 Agrobacterium technique and a gene gun process. Both techniques produced effective protection against the pest but the Agrobacterium transformants were superior.
