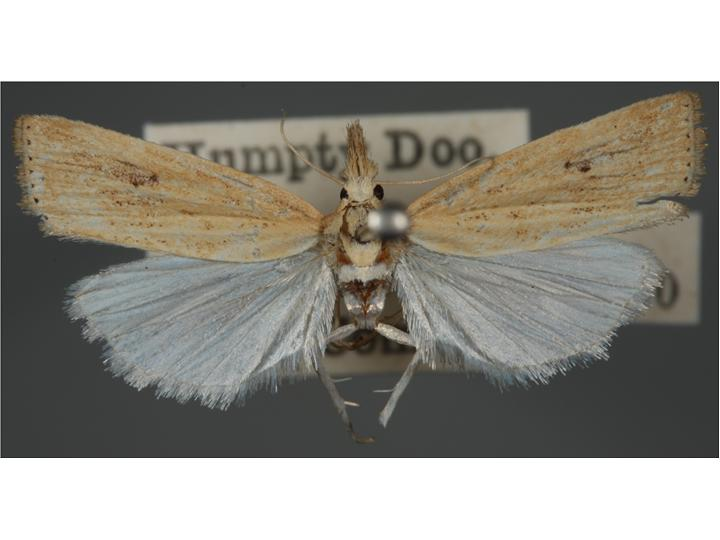
- Female
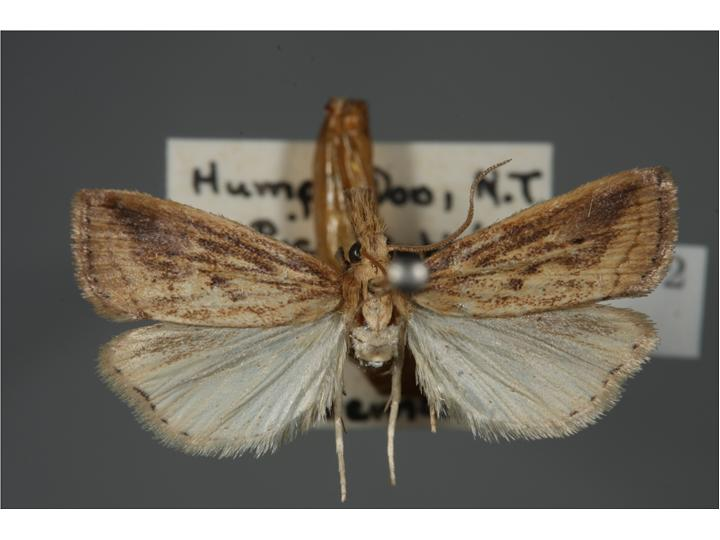
- Male

Scientific classification
- Domain: Eukaryota
- Kingdom: Animalia
- Phylum: Arthropoda
- Class: Insecta
- Order: Lepidoptera
- Family: Crambidae
- Genus: Chilo
- Species: C. polychrysus

Binomial name
- Chilo polychrysus (Meyrick, 1932)

Synonyms
- Diatraea polychrysus Meyrick, 1932; Chilo polycgrysus Hua, 2005

= Chilo polychrysus =

Species of moth

Chilo polychrysus, the dark-headed striped borer, is a moth in the family Crambidae. It was described by Edward Meyrick in 1932. It is found in India, Malaysia, Thailand, Laos, Vietnam and Indonesia.

The wingspan is 16–25 mm. The wings are yellow brown with small dark spots.

The larvae feed on Cyperaceae and Poaceae species, as well as Oryza sativa, Saccharum officinarum, Triticum species and Zea mays. They bore the stems of their host plant.
