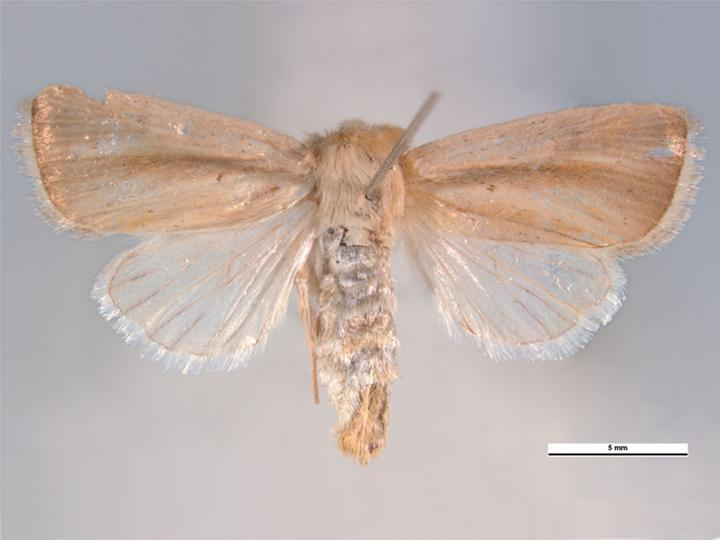
- Dorsal view
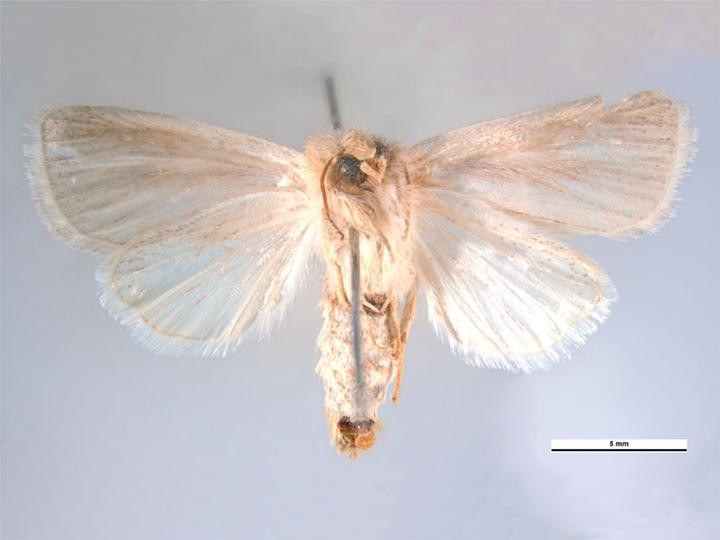
- Ventral view

Scientific classification
- Kingdom: Animalia
- Phylum: Arthropoda
- Class: Insecta
- Order: Lepidoptera
- Superfamily: Noctuoidea
- Family: Noctuidae
- Genus: Sesamia
- Species: S. inferens

Binomial name
- Sesamia inferens (Walker, 1856)

Synonyms
- Leucania inferens Walker, 1856; Leucania proscripta Walker, 1856; Sesamia tranquilaris Butler, 1880; Nonagria gracilis Butler, 1880; Sesamia albicillata Snellen, 1880; Nonagria innocens Butler, 1881; Sesamia creticoides Strand, 1920; Sesamia kosempoana Strand, 1920; Sesamia sokutsuana Strand, 1920; Semasia hirayamae Matsumura, 1929

= Sesamia inferens =

Asiatic pink stem borer

Species of moth

Sesamia inferens, the Asiatic pink stem borer, gramineous stem borer, pink borer, pink rice borer, pink rice stem borer, pink stem borer, purple borer, purple stem borer or purplish stem borer, is a moth of the family Noctuidae. The species was first described by Francis Walker in 1856. It is found from Pakistan, India, Sri Lanka, Myanmar to Japan and the Solomon Islands. A polyphagous species, it is a major pest in many crops worldwide.

== Description ==
Its wingspan is about 28 mm. Hindwings with veins 3 and 4 from arise from the cell. Antennae of male ciliated and simple in female. Body ochreous. Forewings with a red-brown suffusion along median nervure and veins 2 to 5. A sub-marginal dark line present. Cilia paler. Hindwings are whitish.

Larva smooth and shiny and lack obvious hairs or markings. Color variable but usually cream white with a distinctive pink suffusion. The head and prothoracic shield are brown. The dorsal part of the last abdominal segment bearing the anus is yellowish brown. Mature larvae are between 30–40 mm long, pink with buff and pink dorsal markings and a brown head. Pupae are up to about 18 mm long, brown to yellowish-brown with a wrinkled frontal region of the head and cremaster with four large and two small spines.

== Ecology ==
The larvae mostly feed on Gramineae species, including Coix, Echinochloa, Oryza, Panicum, Saccharum, Setaria, Triticum, Zea and Zizania. Many of the food plants are of economic importance.

== Symptoms ==
The caterpillars mainly bore into rice stems or the base of the panicle. After infection, the stem becomes wilted causing deadheart. Panicle attack leads to panicle to be cut leading to state called whitehead. Symptoms are mostly similar to other stem borers and hence closer look required to control the attack.

== Control ==
Mechanical controlling using hand picking and pheromone traps are used. Cultural practices like crop rotation mechanisms, reducing water levels are also used in controlling. Natural enemies such as parasitoides are very effective and nature loving controlling measures. The tachinid fly Sturmiopsis inferens was also once used, but is now not effective due to their low abundance. In chemical control, BHC, DDT, fenthion, fenitrothion, quinalphos, phosphamidon sprays and granules of lindane are used. Eggs can be eliminated by introducing Trichogramma minutum and Telenomeus species. Apanteles flavipes, Bracon chinensis and Sturmiopsis inferens are effective against caterpillars, whereas Xanthopinpla species and Tetrastichus aygari are used in pupal stages.

== See also ==
- Sesamia calamistis, the African pink stem borer
