= Hymenobacter mucosus =

Scientific classification
- Domain: Bacteria
- Kingdom: Pseudomonadati
- Phylum: Bacteroidota
- Class: Cytophagia
- Order: Cytophagales
- Family: Hymenobacteraceae
- Genus: Hymenobacter
- Species: H. mucosus

Binomial name
- Hymenobacter mucosus Liu et al. 2015

Type strain
- DSM 28041, YIM 77969, KCTC 32567

Species of bacterium

Hymenobacter mucosus is a Gram-negative, rod-shaped and non-motile bacterium from the genus Hymenobacter which has been isolated from soil from the Jiuxiang cave in China. It produces red, watermelonlike pigment from the plectaniaxanthin series of carotenoid pigments. The 16S RNA analysis has revealed its similarity to Hymenobacter tibetensis, Hymenobacter gelipurpurascens and Hymenobacter xinjiangensis
