= Cesiribacter andamanensis =

Scientific classification
- Domain: Bacteria
- Kingdom: Pseudomonadati
- Phylum: Bacteroidota
- Class: Cytophagia
- Order: Cytophagales
- Family: Cesiribacteraceae
- Genus: Cesiribacter
- Species: C. andamanensis

Binomial name
- Cesiribacter andamanensis Srinivas et al. 2011

Type strain
- AMV16, CCUG 58431, CIP 110152, DSM 22818

Species of bacterium

Cesiribacter andamanensis is a Gram-negative, rod-shaped and non-motile bacterium from the family Cesiribacteraceae which has been isolated from soil from a mud volcano on the Andaman Islands, a Union Territory of India. The bacterium was closest to the genus Marivirga. The growth was observed at 18–37 °C but had the most growth around 30–37 °C.
