= Persicobacter diffluens =

Scientific classification
- Domain: Bacteria
- Kingdom: Pseudomonadati
- Phylum: Bacteroidota
- Class: Cytophagia
- Order: Cytophagales
- Family: Persicobacteraceae
- Genus: Persicobacter
- Species: P. diffluens

Binomial name
- Persicobacter diffluens (Reichenbach 1989) Nakagawa et al. 1997

Type strain
- ATCC 49458, B-1, DSM 3658, IAM 14117, IFO 15940, JCM 8513, KCTC 12353, LMG 13036, NBRC 15940, NCIMB 1402, NCMB 1402

Synonyms
- Cytophaga diffluens

Species of bacterium

Persicobacter diffluens is a gram-negative bacterium from the genus of Porifericola which has been isolated from marine mud from Bombay in India.
