= Persicobacter psychrovividus =

Scientific classification
- Domain: Bacteria
- Kingdom: Pseudomonadati
- Phylum: Bacteroidota
- Class: Cytophagia
- Order: Cytophagales
- Family: Persicobacteraceae
- Genus: Persicobacter
- Species: P. psychrovividus

Binomial name
- Persicobacter psychrovividus Muramatsu et al. 2010

Type strain
- CIP 109100, NBRC 101262, NBRC 101035, NBRC 101041, Asr2219

Species of bacterium

Persicobacter psychrovividus is a Gram-negative, facultatively anaerobic and motile bacterium from the genus of Porifericola which has been isolated from shellfish in Japan.
