= Hymenobacter saemangeumensis =

Scientific classification
- Domain: Bacteria
- Kingdom: Pseudomonadati
- Phylum: Bacteroidota
- Class: Cytophagia
- Order: Cytophagales
- Family: Hymenobacteraceae
- Genus: Hymenobacter
- Species: H. saemangeumensis

Binomial name
- Hymenobacter saemangeumensis Kang et al. 2013

Type strain
- GSR0100, JCM 17923, KACC 16452

Species of bacterium

Hymenobacter saemangeumensis is a Gram-negative, extremely halophilic and non-motile bacterium from the genus Hymenobacter which has been isolated from a salt mine in Wensu County in China.
