= Hymenobacter koreensis =

Scientific classification
- Domain: Bacteria
- Kingdom: Pseudomonadati
- Phylum: Bacteroidota
- Class: Cytophagia
- Order: Cytophagales
- Family: Hymenobacteraceae
- Genus: Hymenobacter
- Species: H. koreensis

Binomial name
- Hymenobacter koreensis Kang et al. 2013

Type strain
- GYR3077, JCM 17924, KACC 16451

Species of bacterium

Hymenobacter koreensis is an extremely halophilic and aerobic bacterium from the genus Hymenobacter which has been isolated from a salt mine in Wensu County in China.
