= Hymenobacter qilianensis =

Scientific classification
- Domain: Bacteria
- Kingdom: Pseudomonadati
- Phylum: Bacteroidota
- Class: Cytophagia
- Order: Cytophagales
- Family: Hymenobacteraceae
- Genus: Hymenobacter
- Species: H. qilianensis

Binomial name
- Hymenobacter qilianensis Han et al. 2014

Type strain
- CGMCC 1.12720, DK6-37, JCM 19763

Species of bacterium

Hymenobacter qilianensis is a Gram-negative, rod-shaped, non-spore-forming and non-motile bacterium from the genus Hymenobacter which has been isolated from the permafrost region of Qilian Mountains in China.
