= Nafulsella turpanensis =

Scientific classification
- Domain: Bacteria
- Kingdom: Pseudomonadati
- Phylum: Bacteroidota
- Class: Cytophagia
- Order: Cytophagales
- Family: Cesiribacteraceae
- Genus: Nafulsella
- Species: N. turpanensis

Binomial name
- Nafulsella turpanensis Zhang et al. 2013

Type strain
- CCTCC AB 208222, KCTC 23983, ZLM-10

Species of bacterium

Nafulsella turpanensis is a Gram-negative and rod-shaped bacterium from the genus Nafulsella, which has been isolated from soil from the Xinjiang province in China.
