= Hymenobacter rubripertinctus =

Scientific classification
- Domain: Bacteria
- Kingdom: Pseudomonadati
- Phylum: Bacteroidota
- Class: Cytophagia
- Order: Cytophagales
- Family: Hymenobacteraceae
- Genus: Hymenobacter
- Species: H. rubripertinctus

Binomial name
- Hymenobacter rubripertinctus Jiang et al. 2018

Type strain
- CCTCC AB 2017095, NY03-3-30

Species of bacterium

Hymenobacter rubripertinctus is a Gram-negative, aerobic, rod-shaped and non-motile bacterium from the genus Hymenobacter which has been isolated from soil from the Antarctic tundra.
