= Hymenobacter coalescens =

Scientific classification
- Domain: Bacteria
- Kingdom: Pseudomonadati
- Phylum: Bacteroidota
- Class: Cytophagia
- Order: Cytophagales
- Family: Hymenobacteraceae
- Genus: Hymenobacter
- Species: H. coalescens

Binomial name
- Hymenobacter coalescens Kang et al. 2016

Type strain
- WW84, JCM 19493, KCTC 32530

Species of bacterium

Hymenobacter coalescens is a Gram-negative, aerobic, rod-shaped and non-motile bacterium from the genus Hymenobacter which has been isolated from water from the Woopo wetland.
