= Hymenobacter paludis =

Scientific classification
- Domain: Bacteria
- Kingdom: Pseudomonadati
- Phylum: Bacteroidota
- Class: Cytophagia
- Order: Cytophagales
- Family: Hymenobacteraceae
- Genus: Hymenobacter
- Species: H. paludis

Binomial name
- Hymenobacter paludis Chen et al. 2016

Type strain
- KBP-30, KCTC 32237, LMG 27293

Species of bacterium

Hymenobacter paludis is a gram-negative bacterium from the genus of Hymenobacter which has been isolated from the marsh from the Banping Lake Wetland Park in Taiwan.
