= Hymenobacter marinus =

Scientific classification
- Domain: Bacteria
- Kingdom: Pseudomonadati
- Phylum: Bacteroidota
- Class: Cytophagia
- Order: Cytophagales
- Family: Hymenobacteraceae
- Genus: Hymenobacter
- Species: H. marinus

Binomial name
- Hymenobacter marinus Kang et al. 2016

Type strain
- CECT 9069, KJ035, KCTC 42854

Species of bacterium

Hymenobacter marinus is a Gram-negative and non-motile bacterium from the genus of Hymenobacter which has been isolated from coastal seawater from the Sea of Japan on Korea.
