= Hymenobacter roseosalivarius =

Scientific classification
- Domain: Bacteria
- Kingdom: Pseudomonadati
- Phylum: Bacteroidota
- Class: Cytophagia
- Order: Cytophagales
- Family: Hymenobacteraceae
- Genus: Hymenobacter
- Species: H. roseosalivarius

Binomial name
- Hymenobacter roseosalivarius Hirsch et al. 1999

Type strain
- AA-718, CIP 106397, DSM 11622

Synonyms
- Hymenobacter roseisalivarius

Species of bacterium

Hymenobacter roseosalivarius is a Gram-negative bacterium from the genus Hymenobacter which has been isolated from soil and sandstone from the Antarctica.
