= Hymenobacter coccineus =

Scientific classification
- Domain: Bacteria
- Kingdom: Pseudomonadati
- Phylum: Bacteroidota
- Class: Cytophagia
- Order: Cytophagales
- Family: Hymenobacteraceae
- Genus: Hymenobacter
- Species: H. coccineus

Binomial name
- Hymenobacter coccineus Sedláček et al. 2017

Species of bacterium

Hymenobacter coccineus is a Gram-negative and rod-shaped bacterium from the genus Hymenobacter which has been isolated from a rock from the James Ross Island in the Antarctica.
