= Hymenobacter sedentarius =

Scientific classification
- Domain: Bacteria
- Kingdom: Pseudomonadati
- Phylum: Bacteroidota
- Class: Cytophagia
- Order: Cytophagales
- Family: Hymenobacteraceae
- Genus: Hymenobacter
- Species: H. sedentarius

Binomial name
- Hymenobacter sedentarius Lee et al. 2016

Type strain
- DG5B, JCM 19636, KCTC 32524

Species of bacterium

Hymenobacter sedentarius is a Gram-negative and non-motile bacterium from the genus of Hymenobacter which has been isolated from soil.
