= Hymenobacter latericoloratus =

Scientific classification
- Domain: Bacteria
- Kingdom: Pseudomonadati
- Phylum: Bacteroidota
- Class: Cytophagia
- Order: Cytophagales
- Family: Hymenobacteraceae
- Genus: Hymenobacter
- Species: H. latericoloratus

Binomial name
- Hymenobacter latericoloratus Liu et al. 2015

Type strain
- CCTCC AB 2012949, YIM 77920, JCM 30327

Species of bacterium

Hymenobacter latericoloratus is a Gram-negative, rod-shaped, aerobic and non-motile bacterium from the genus Hymenobacter which has been isolated from freshwater sediments from the Jiuxiang tourist cave from Yunnan in China.
