= Hymenobacter psychrotolerans =

Scientific classification
- Domain: Bacteria
- Kingdom: Pseudomonadati
- Phylum: Bacteroidota
- Class: Cytophagia
- Order: Cytophagales
- Family: Hymenobacteraceae
- Genus: Hymenobacter
- Species: H. psychrotolerans

Binomial name
- Hymenobacter psychrotolerans Zhang et al. 2008

Type strain
- CGMCC 1.6365, DSM 18569, Tibet-IIU11

Species of bacterium

Hymenobacter psychrotolerans is a gram-negative bacterium from the genus Hymenobacter which has been isolated from permafrost sediments from the Qinghai-Tibet Plateau in China.
