= Reichenbachiella faecimaris =

Scientific classification
- Domain: Bacteria
- Kingdom: Pseudomonadati
- Phylum: Bacteroidota
- Class: Cytophagia
- Order: Cytophagales
- Family: Reichenbachiellaceae
- Genus: Reichenbachiella
- Species: R. faecimaris

Binomial name
- Reichenbachiella faecimaris Cha et al. 2011

Type strain
- JCM 16588, KACC 14523, PCP11

Species of bacterium

Reichenbachiella faecimaris is a gram-negative bacterium from the genus Reichenbachiella which has been isolated from tidal flat sediments from the Yellow Sea in Korea.
