= Hymenobacter aquaticus =

Scientific classification
- Domain: Bacteria
- Kingdom: Pseudomonadati
- Phylum: Bacteroidota
- Class: Cytophagia
- Order: Cytophagales
- Family: Hymenobacteraceae
- Genus: Hymenobacter
- Species: H. aquaticus

Binomial name
- Hymenobacter aquaticus Lee et al. 2017

Type strain
- JCM 31653, KCTC 52194, strain 16F3P

Species of bacterium

Hymenobacter arcticus is a Gram-negative, aerobic, rod-shaped, non-spore-forming and non-motile bacterium from the genus Hymenobacter which has been isolated from the Han River in Korea.
