= Hymenobacter daeguensis =

Scientific classification
- Domain: Bacteria
- Kingdom: Pseudomonadati
- Phylum: Bacteroidota
- Class: Cytophagia
- Order: Cytophagales
- Family: Hymenobacteraceae
- Genus: Hymenobacter
- Species: H. daeguensis

Binomial name
- Hymenobacter daeguensis Ten et al. 2017

Species of bacterium

Hymenobacter daeguensis is a Gram-negative, rod-shaped, non-spore-forming, aerobic and non-motile bacterium from the genus Hymenobacter which has been isolated from water from the Han River in Korea.
