= Fulvivirga imtechensis =

Scientific classification
- Domain: Bacteria
- Kingdom: Pseudomonadati
- Phylum: Bacteroidota
- Class: Cytophagia
- Order: Cytophagales
- Family: Fulvivirgaceae
- Genus: Fulvivirga
- Species: F. imtechensis

Binomial name
- Fulvivirga imtechensis Nupur et al. 2012

Type strain
- AK7, JCM 17390, MTCC 11053

Species of bacterium

Fulvivirga imtechensis is a Gram-negative, obligately aerobic rod-shaped and non-motile bacterium from the genus Fulvivirga which has been isolated from the coast of Visakhapatnam in India.
