= Hymenobacter daecheongensis =

Scientific classification
- Domain: Bacteria
- Kingdom: Pseudomonadati
- Phylum: Bacteroidota
- Class: Cytophagia
- Order: Cytophagales
- Family: Hymenobacteraceae
- Genus: Hymenobacter
- Species: H. daecheongensis

Binomial name
- Hymenobacter daecheongensis Xu et al. 2009

Type strain
- Dae14, DSM 21074, KCTC 22258, LMG 24498

Species of bacterium

Hymenobacter daecheongensis is a Gram-negative, non-spore-forming, strictly aerobic and rod-shaped bacterium from the genus Hymenobacter which has been isolated from stream sediments from the Daecheong Dam in Korea.
