= Hymenobacter nivis =

Scientific classification
- Domain: Bacteria
- Kingdom: Pseudomonadati
- Phylum: Bacteroidota
- Class: Cytophagia
- Order: Cytophagales
- Family: Hymenobacteraceae
- Genus: Hymenobacter
- Species: H. nivis

Binomial name
- Hymenobacter nivis Kojima et al. 2016

Type strain
- DSM 101755, NBRC 111535, NBRC 111535, strain P3

Species of bacterium

Hymenobacter nivis is a Gram-negative, aerobic, rod-shaped and non-motile bacterium from the genus of Hymenobacter which has been isolated from red snow from the Antarctica.
