= Hymenobacter rubidus =

Scientific classification
- Domain: Bacteria
- Kingdom: Pseudomonadati
- Phylum: Bacteroidota
- Class: Cytophagia
- Order: Cytophagales
- Family: Hymenobacteraceae
- Genus: Hymenobacter
- Species: H. rubidus

Binomial name
- Hymenobacter rubidus Lee et al. 2016

Type strain
- DG7B, JCM 30008, KCTC 32553, KEMB 9004-166

Species of bacterium

Hymenobacter rubidus is a Gram-negative, short-rod-shaped and non-motile bacterium from the genus Hymenobacter which has been isolated from soil from Seoul on Korea.
