= Hymenobacter tenuis =

Scientific classification
- Domain: Bacteria
- Kingdom: Pseudomonadati
- Phylum: Bacteroidota
- Class: Cytophagia
- Order: Cytophagales
- Family: Hymenobacteraceae
- Genus: Hymenobacter
- Species: H. tenuis

Binomial name
- Hymenobacter tenuis Kang et al. 2017

Type strain
- JCM 31659, KCTC 52271, strain POB6

Species of bacterium

Hymenobacter tenuis is a Gram-negative and aerobic bacterium from the genus Hymenobacter which has been isolated from a wastewater treatment plant from Korea.
