= Hymenobacter roseus =

Scientific classification
- Domain: Bacteria
- Kingdom: Pseudomonadati
- Phylum: Bacteroidota
- Class: Cytophagia
- Order: Cytophagales
- Family: Hymenobacteraceae
- Genus: Hymenobacter
- Species: H. roseus

Binomial name
- Hymenobacter roseus Subhash et al. 2014

Type strain
- KCTC 42090, LMG 28260, JC245

Species of bacterium

Hymenobacter roseus is a Gram-negative bacterium from the genus Hymenobacter which has been isolated from sand.
