= Hymenobacter kanuolensis =

Scientific classification
- Domain: Bacteria
- Kingdom: Pseudomonadati
- Phylum: Bacteroidota
- Class: Cytophagia
- Order: Cytophagales
- Family: Hymenobacteraceae
- Genus: Hymenobacter
- Species: H. kanuolensis

Binomial name
- Hymenobacter kanuolensis Su et al. 2014

Type strain
- ACCC 05760, T-3, KCTC 32407

Species of bacterium

Hymenobacter kanuolensis is a Gram-negative, rod-shaped, radiation-resistant and non-motile bacterium from the genus Hymenobacter which has been isolated from soil from the Qinghai-Tibet Plateau in Tibet in China.
