= Hymenobacter chitinivorans =

Scientific classification
- Domain: Bacteria
- Kingdom: Pseudomonadati
- Phylum: Bacteroidota
- Class: Cytophagia
- Order: Cytophagales
- Family: Hymenobacteraceae
- Genus: Hymenobacter
- Species: H. chitinivorans

Binomial name
- Hymenobacter chitinivorans Buczolits et al. 2006

Type strain
- CIP 109677, DSM 11115, LMG 21872, LMG 21951, M6)T, MyxT299T, Tx c1 (MyxT299T, Txc1

Synonyms
- Taxeobacter chitinovorans

Species of bacterium

Hymenobacter chitinivorans is a gram-negative bacterium from the genus Hymenobacter which has been isolated from soil from Crete in Greece.
