= Hymenobacter pallidus =

Scientific classification
- Domain: Bacteria
- Kingdom: Pseudomonadati
- Phylum: Bacteroidota
- Class: Cytophagia
- Order: Cytophagales
- Family: Hymenobacteraceae
- Genus: Hymenobacter
- Species: H. pallidus

Binomial name
- Hymenobacter pallidus Sheu et al. 2017

Type strain
- BCRC 80919, LYH-12, KCTC 42898, LMG 29171

Species of bacterium

Hymenobacter pallidus is a gram-negative bacterium from the genus of Hymenobacter which has been isolated from a pond in Taiwan.
