= Reichenbachiella versicolor =

Scientific classification
- Domain: Bacteria
- Kingdom: Pseudomonadati
- Phylum: Bacteroidota
- Class: Cytophagia
- Order: Cytophagales
- Family: Reichenbachiellaceae
- Genus: Reichenbachiella
- Species: R. versicolor

Binomial name
- Reichenbachiella versicolor Shi et al. 2018

Type strain
- DC003

Species of bacterium

Reichenbachiella versicolor is a Gram-negative, strictly aerobic and rod-shaped bacterium from the genus Reichenbachiella which has been isolated from the alga Gracilaria blodgettii from the coast of Lingshui County.
