= Hymenobacter deserti =

Scientific classification
- Domain: Bacteria
- Kingdom: Pseudomonadati
- Phylum: Bacteroidota
- Class: Cytophagia
- Order: Cytophagales
- Family: Hymenobacteraceae
- Genus: Hymenobacter
- Species: H. deserti

Binomial name
- Hymenobacter deserti Zhang et al. 2009

Type strain
- CCTCC AB 207171, ZLB-3, NRRL B-51267

Species of bacterium

Hymenobacter deserti is a Gram-negative, rod-shaped and non-motile bacterium from the genus Hymenobacter which has been isolated from soil from the desert of Xinjiang in China.
