= Hymenobacter psychrophilus =

Scientific classification
- Domain: Bacteria
- Kingdom: Pseudomonadati
- Phylum: Bacteroidota
- Class: Cytophagia
- Order: Cytophagales
- Family: Hymenobacteraceae
- Genus: Hymenobacter
- Species: H. psychrophilus

Binomial name
- Hymenobacter psychrophilus Zhang et al. 2011

Type strain
- BZ33r, CGMCC 1.8975, CIP 110132, DSM 22290, LMG 25548

Species of bacterium

Hymenobacter psychrophilus is a Gram-negative, psychrophilic, aerobic, rod-shaped and non-motile bacterium from the genus Hymenobacter which has been isolated from the soil of an industrial estate in Bozen, Italy.
