= Hymenobacter norwichensis =

Scientific classification
- Domain: Bacteria
- Kingdom: Pseudomonadati
- Phylum: Bacteroidota
- Class: Cytophagia
- Order: Cytophagales
- Family: Hymenobacteraceae
- Genus: Hymenobacter
- Species: H. norwichensis

Binomial name
- Hymenobacter norwichensis Buczolits et al. 2006

Type strain
- DSM 15439, LMG 21876, NS/50

Species of bacterium

Hymenobacter norwichensis is a gram-negative bacterium from the genus Hymenobacter which has been isolated from air from the Centre for Visual Arts in the United Kingdom.
