= Hymenobacter glaciei =

Scientific classification
- Domain: Bacteria
- Kingdom: Pseudomonadati
- Phylum: Bacteroidota
- Class: Cytophagia
- Order: Cytophagales
- Family: Hymenobacteraceae
- Genus: Hymenobacter
- Species: H. glaciei

Binomial name
- Hymenobacter glaciei Klassen and Foght 2011

Species of bacterium

Hymenobacter glaciei is a species of bacteria first isolated from Victoria Upper Glacier, Antarctica on basal ice. It is a psychrotolerant, heterotrophic aerobe. It is notable for the prevalence of horizontal gene transfers in its evolution, possibly due to dormancy because of its habitat.
