= Hymenobacter ruber =

Scientific classification
- Domain: Bacteria
- Kingdom: Pseudomonadati
- Phylum: Bacteroidota
- Class: Cytophagia
- Order: Cytophagales
- Family: Hymenobacteraceae
- Genus: Hymenobacter
- Species: H. ruber

Binomial name
- Hymenobacter ruber Jin et al. 2014

Type strain
- PB156, JCM 19433, KCTC 32477

Species of bacterium

Hymenobacter ruber is a Gram-negative, aerobic, non-spore-forming, rod-shaped and non-motile bacterium from the genus Hymenobacter which has been isolated from grass soil.
