= Hymenobacter pedocola =

Scientific classification
- Domain: Bacteria
- Kingdom: Pseudomonadati
- Phylum: Bacteroidota
- Class: Cytophagia
- Order: Cytophagales
- Family: Hymenobacteraceae
- Genus: Hymenobacter
- Species: H. pedocola

Binomial name
- Hymenobacter pedocola Lim et al. 2018

Type strain
- JCM 32198, KCTC 52730, strain S12-2-1

Species of bacterium

Hymenobacter pedocola is a Gram-negative and aerobic bacterium from the genus of Hymenobacter which has been isolated from soil from Gyeongsangnam-do in Korea.
