= Hymenobacter seoulensis =

Scientific classification
- Domain: Bacteria
- Kingdom: Pseudomonadati
- Phylum: Bacteroidota
- Class: Cytophagia
- Order: Cytophagales
- Family: Hymenobacteraceae
- Genus: Hymenobacter
- Species: H. seoulensis

Binomial name
- Hymenobacter seoulensis Lee et al. 2017

Type strain
- JCM 31655, KCTC 52197, strain 16F7G

Species of bacterium

Hymenobacter seoulensis is a Gram-negative, aerobic, rod-shaped and non-motile bacterium from the genus of Hymenobacter which has been isolated from water from a river.
