= Fulvivirga lutimaris =

Scientific classification
- Domain: Bacteria
- Kingdom: Pseudomonadati
- Phylum: Bacteroidota
- Class: Cytophagia
- Order: Cytophagales
- Family: Fulvivirgaceae
- Genus: Fulvivirga
- Species: F. lutimaris

Binomial name
- Fulvivirga lutimaris Jung et al. 2016

Type strain
- CECT 9024, KCTC 42720, TM-6

Species of bacterium

Fulvivirga lutimaris is a Gram-negative and rod-shaped bacterium from the genus Fulvivirga which has been isolated from tidal flat sediments from the Yellow Sea in Korea.
