= Hymenobacter monticola =

Scientific classification
- Domain: Bacteria
- Kingdom: Pseudomonadati
- Phylum: Bacteroidota
- Class: Cytophagia
- Order: Cytophagales
- Family: Hymenobacteraceae
- Genus: Hymenobacter
- Species: H. monticola

Binomial name
- Hymenobacter monticola Fan et al. 2016

Type strain
- CCTCC AB 2015206, XF-6R, KCTC 42733

Species of bacterium

Hymenobacter monticola is a Gram-negative, aerobic, rod-shaped and non-motile bacterium from the genus Hymenobacter which has been isolated from mountain soil in Sichuan in China.
