= Hymenobacter actinosclerus =

Scientific classification
- Domain: Bacteria
- Kingdom: Pseudomonadati
- Phylum: Bacteroidota
- Class: Cytophagia
- Order: Cytophagales
- Family: Hymenobacteraceae
- Genus: Hymenobacter
- Species: H. actinosclerus

Binomial name
- Hymenobacter actinosclerus Collins et al. 2000

Type strain
- CCUG 39621, CIP 106628

Species of bacterium

Hymenobacter actinosclerus is a bacterium from the genus Hymenobacter which has been isolated from pork chops.
