= Cesiribacter roseus =

Scientific classification
- Domain: Bacteria
- Kingdom: Pseudomonadati
- Phylum: Bacteroidota
- Class: Cytophagia
- Order: Cytophagales
- Family: Cesiribacteraceae
- Genus: Cesiribacter
- Species: C. roseus

Binomial name
- Cesiribacter roseus Liu et al. 2012

Type strain
- CCTCC AB 207142, KACC 15456, 311

Species of bacterium

Cesiribacter roseus is a Gram-negative, rod-shaped, strictly aerobic and motile bacterium from the genus Cesiribacter which has been isolated from desert sand in Xinjiang in China.
