= Hymenobacter arcticus =

Scientific classification
- Domain: Bacteria
- Kingdom: Pseudomonadati
- Phylum: Bacteroidota
- Class: Cytophagia
- Order: Cytophagales
- Family: Hymenobacteraceae
- Genus: Hymenobacter
- Species: H. arcticus

Binomial name
- Hymenobacter arcticus Chang et al. 2014

Type strain
- CCTCC AB 2012104, KACC 16881, R-2-4

Species of bacterium

Hymenobacter arcticus is a Gram-negative, aerobic and rod-shaped bacterium from the genus Hymenobacter which has been isolated from a glacial till sample near Ny-Ålesund in Norway.
