= Hymenobacter rutilus =

Scientific classification
- Domain: Bacteria
- Kingdom: Pseudomonadati
- Phylum: Bacteroidota
- Class: Cytophagia
- Order: Cytophagales
- Family: Hymenobacteraceae
- Genus: Hymenobacter
- Species: H. rutilus

Binomial name
- Hymenobacter rutilus Kim et al. 2017

Type strain
- CCTCC AB 2016091, KCTC 52447, K2-33028

Species of bacterium

Hymenobacter rutilus is a Gram-negative, aerobic, rod-shaped, non-spore-forming and non-motile bacterium from the genus Hymenobacter which has been isolated from marine sediments from the Kings Bay in Norway.
