= Terrenus =

Terrenus may refer to:

- Dolophrades terrenus, species of beetle
- Euxoa terrenus, species of cutworm
- Hymenobacter terrenus, species of bacteria
- Tucales terrenus, species of beetle
- Ureibacillus terrenus, species of bacteria
