= Hymenobacter gummosus =

Scientific classification
- Domain: Bacteria
- Kingdom: Pseudomonadati
- Phylum: Bacteroidota
- Class: Cytophagia
- Order: Cytophagales
- Family: Hymenobacteraceae
- Genus: Hymenobacter
- Species: H. gummosus

Binomial name
- Hymenobacter gummosus Chen et al. 2017

Species of bacterium

Hymenobacter gummosus is a Gram-negative, aerobic and motile bacterium from the genus Hymenobacter which has been isolated from water from the Longtoushan Spring in Taiwan.
