= Hymenobacter terrae =

Scientific classification
- Domain: Bacteria
- Kingdom: Pseudomonadati
- Phylum: Bacteroidota
- Class: Cytophagia
- Order: Cytophagales
- Family: Hymenobacteraceae
- Genus: Hymenobacter
- Species: H. terrae

Binomial name
- Hymenobacter terrae Srinivasan et al. 2017

Type strain
- DG7A, JCM 30007, KCTC 32554, KEMB 9004-164

Species of bacterium

Hymenobacter terrae is a gram-negative bacterium from the genus Hymenobacter which has been isolated from soil from Seoul in Korea.
