= Hymenobacter soli =

Scientific classification
- Domain: Bacteria
- Kingdom: Pseudomonadati
- Phylum: Bacteroidota
- Class: Cytophagia
- Order: Cytophagales
- Family: Hymenobacteraceae
- Genus: Hymenobacter
- Species: H. soli

Binomial name
- Hymenobacter soli Kim et al. 2008

Type strain
- KCTC 12607, LMG 23481, LMG 24002, LMG 24240, PB17

Species of bacterium

Hymenobacter soli is a Gram-negative, strictly aerobic, non-spore-forming and rod-shaped bacterium from the genus of Hymenobacter which has been isolated from grass soil in Korea.
