= Hymenobacter aerophilus =

Scientific classification
- Domain: Bacteria
- Kingdom: Pseudomonadati
- Phylum: Bacteroidota
- Class: Cytophagia
- Order: Cytophagales
- Family: Hymenobacteraceae
- Genus: Hymenobacter
- Species: H. aerophilus

Binomial name
- Hymenobacter aerophilus Buczolits et al. 2002

Type strain
- CCUG 49624, CIP 107733, DSM 13606, I/26Cor1, LMG 19657

Synonyms
- Rubromicrobium aerophilum

Species of bacterium

Hymenobacter aerophilus is a Gram-negative, non-spore-forming, aerobic and rod-shaped bacterium from the genus Hymenobacter which has been isolated from airborne from the Museo Correr in Venice in Italy.
