= Fulvivirga kasyanovii =

Scientific classification
- Domain: Bacteria
- Kingdom: Pseudomonadati
- Phylum: Bacteroidota
- Class: Cytophagia
- Order: Cytophagales
- Family: Fulvivirgaceae
- Genus: Fulvivirga
- Species: F. kasyanovii

Binomial name
- Fulvivirga kasyanovii Nedashkovskaya et al. 2007

Type strain
- CCTCC AB 206119, JCM 16186, KCTC 12832, KMM 6220

Species of bacterium

Fulvivirga kasyanovii is a Gram-negative, heterotrophic and strictly aerobic bacterium from the genus Fulvivirga which has been isolated from seawater from a mussel farm.
