= Hymenobacter rigui =

Scientific classification
- Domain: Bacteria
- Kingdom: Pseudomonadati
- Phylum: Bacteroidota
- Class: Cytophagia
- Order: Cytophagales
- Family: Hymenobacteraceae
- Genus: Hymenobacter
- Species: H. rigui

Binomial name
- Hymenobacter rigui Baik et al. 2006

Type strain
- IMSNU 14116, KCTC 12533, NBRC 101118, WPCB131

Species of bacterium

Hymenobacter rigui is a Gram-negative, rod-shaped and non-motile bacterium from the genus Hymenobacter which has been isolated from water from the Woopo wetland in Korea.
