= Hymenobacter rufus =

Scientific classification
- Domain: Bacteria
- Kingdom: Pseudomonadati
- Phylum: Bacteroidota
- Class: Cytophagia
- Order: Cytophagales
- Family: Hymenobacteraceae
- Genus: Hymenobacter
- Species: H. rufus

Binomial name
- Hymenobacter rufus Ohn et al. 2018

Type strain
- JCM 32196, TC 52736, strain S1-2-2-6

Species of bacterium

Hymenobacter rufus is a Gram-negative and rod-shaped bacterium from the genus Hymenobacter which has been isolated from soil from Jeollabuk-do in Korea.
