= Hymenobacter perfusus =

Scientific classification
- Domain: Bacteria
- Kingdom: Pseudomonadati
- Phylum: Bacteroidota
- Class: Cytophagia
- Order: Cytophagales
- Family: Hymenobacteraceae
- Genus: Hymenobacter
- Species: H. perfusus

Binomial name
- Hymenobacter perfusus Chung et al. 2011

Type strain
- A1-12, CIP 110166, LMG 25858, LMG 26000

Species of bacterium

Hymenobacter perfusus is a gram-negative bacterium of the genus Hymenobacter, which has been isolated from a uranium mine waste water treatment system in Urgeiriça, Portugal.
