= Hymenobacter rivuli =

Scientific classification
- Domain: Bacteria
- Kingdom: Pseudomonadati
- Phylum: Bacteroidota
- Class: Cytophagia
- Order: Cytophagales
- Family: Hymenobacteraceae
- Genus: Hymenobacter
- Species: H. rivuli

Binomial name
- Hymenobacter rivuli Sheu et al. 2018

Type strain
- BCRC 80979, TAPP3, KCTC 52236, LMG 29559

Species of bacterium

Hymenobacter rivuli is a gram-negative bacterium from the genus Hymenobacter which has been isolated from water from the Wanan Creek in Taiwan.
