= Hymenobacter frigidus =

Scientific classification
- Domain: Bacteria
- Kingdom: Pseudomonadati
- Phylum: Bacteroidota
- Class: Cytophagia
- Order: Cytophagales
- Family: Hymenobacteraceae
- Genus: Hymenobacter
- Species: H. frigidus

Binomial name
- Hymenobacter frigidus Gu et al. 2017

Species of bacterium

Hymenobacter frigidus is a Gram-negative, psychrophilic and rod-shaped bacterium from the genus Hymenobacter which has been isolated from the ice core of the Muztagh Glacier from the Tibetan Plateau.
