= Hymenobacter ginsengisoli =

Scientific classification
- Domain: Bacteria
- Kingdom: Pseudomonadati
- Phylum: Bacteroidota
- Class: Cytophagia
- Order: Cytophagales
- Family: Hymenobacteraceae
- Genus: Hymenobacter
- Species: H. ginsengisoli

Binomial name
- Hymenobacter ginsengisoli Hoang et al. 2013

Type strain
- DCY57, JCM 17841, KCTC 23674

Species of bacterium

Hymenobacter ginsengisoli is a Gram-negative, and non-motile bacterium from the genus Hymenobacter which has been isolated from soil from a ginseng field from the Chungnam Province in Korea.
