= Hymenobacter ocellatus =

Scientific classification
- Domain: Bacteria
- Kingdom: Pseudomonadati
- Phylum: Bacteroidota
- Class: Cytophagia
- Order: Cytophagales
- Family: Hymenobacteraceae
- Genus: Hymenobacter
- Species: H. ocellatus

Binomial name
- Hymenobacter ocellatus Buczolits et al. 2006

Type strain
- CIP 109676, CIP 109678, DSM 11116, DSM 11117, LMG 21873, LMG 21874, Myx 2105, MyxV2, Tx g1 (MyxV2), Tx o1 (Myx 2105), Txg1, Txo1, Txol1

Synonyms
- Taxeobacter ocellatus

Species of bacterium

Hymenobacter ocellatus is a gram-negative bacterium from the genus Hymenobacter which has been isolated from dung of an antelope in South Africa.
