= Hymenobacter luteus =

Scientific classification
- Domain: Bacteria
- Kingdom: Pseudomonadati
- Phylum: Bacteroidota
- Class: Cytophagia
- Order: Cytophagales
- Family: Hymenobacteraceae
- Genus: Hymenobacter
- Species: H. luteus

Binomial name
- Hymenobacter luteus Liu et al. 2015

Type strain
- CCTCC AB 2012947, YIM 77921, JCM 30328

Species of bacterium

Hymenobacter luteus is a Gram-negative, rod-shaped, aerobic and non-motile bacterium from the genus Hymenobacter which has been isolated from freshwater sediments from the Jiuxiang tourist cave in the Yunnan province in China.
