= Hymenobacter cavernae =

Scientific classification
- Domain: Bacteria
- Kingdom: Pseudomonadati
- Phylum: Bacteroidota
- Class: Cytophagia
- Order: Cytophagales
- Family: Hymenobacteraceae
- Genus: Hymenobacter
- Species: H. cavernae

Binomial name
- Hymenobacter cavernae Zhu et al. 2017

Species of bacterium

Hymenobacter cavernae is a Gram-negative, rod-shaped and non-motile bacterium from the genus Hymenobacter which has been isolated from a karst cave from Guizhou in China.
