= Hymenobacter yonginensis =

Scientific classification
- Domain: Bacteria
- Kingdom: Pseudomonadati
- Phylum: Bacteroidota
- Class: Cytophagia
- Order: Cytophagales
- Family: Hymenobacteraceae
- Genus: Hymenobacter
- Species: H. yonginensis

Binomial name
- Hymenobacter yonginensis Joung et al. 2011

Type strain
- CECT 7546, HMD1010, KCTC 22745

Species of bacterium

Hymenobacter yonginensis is a non-motile bacterium from the genus Hymenobacter which has been isolated from a mesotrophic lake near the campus of Hankuk University of Foreign Studies in Yongin in Korea.
