= Hymenobacter aquatilis =

Scientific classification
- Domain: Bacteria
- Kingdom: Pseudomonadati
- Phylum: Bacteroidota
- Class: Cytophagia
- Order: Cytophagales
- Family: Hymenobacteraceae
- Genus: Hymenobacter
- Species: H. aquatilis

Binomial name
- Hymenobacter aquatilis Kang et al. 2018

Species of bacterium

Hymenobacter aquatilis is a Gram-negative, aerobic and non-motile bacterium from the genus Hymenobacter which has been isolated from water from a mesotrophic artificial lake in Korea.
