= Hymenobacter wooponensis =

Scientific classification
- Domain: Bacteria
- Kingdom: Pseudomonadati
- Phylum: Bacteroidota
- Class: Cytophagia
- Order: Cytophagales
- Family: Hymenobacteraceae
- Genus: Hymenobacter
- Species: H. wooponensis

Binomial name
- Hymenobacter wooponensis Kang et al. 2015

Type strain
- JCM 19491, KCTC 32528, WM78

Species of bacterium

Hymenobacter wooponensis is a Gram-negative, aerobic, rod-shaped and non-motile bacterium from the genusHymenobacter which has been isolated from whater from Woopo wetland in Korea.
