= Hymenobacter glacieicola =

Scientific classification
- Domain: Bacteria
- Kingdom: Pseudomonadati
- Phylum: Bacteroidota
- Class: Cytophagia
- Order: Cytophagales
- Family: Hymenobacteraceae
- Genus: Hymenobacter
- Species: H. glacieicola

Binomial name
- Hymenobacter glacieicola Liu et al. 2016

Type strain
- CGMCC 1.12990, B1909, JCM 30596

Species of bacterium

Hymenobacter glacieicola is a Gram-negative, rod-shaped and non-motile bacterium from the genus Hymenobacter which has been isolated from glacier ice from the Muztagh Glacier from the Tibetan Plateau in China.
