= Reichenbachiella agariperforans =

Scientific classification
- Domain: Bacteria
- Kingdom: Pseudomonadati
- Phylum: Bacteroidota
- Class: Cytophagia
- Order: Cytophagales
- Family: Reichenbachiellaceae
- Genus: Reichenbachiella
- Species: R. agariperforans

Binomial name
- Reichenbachiella agariperforans (Nedashkovskaya et al. 2003) Nedashkovskaya et al. 2005

Type strain
- CIP 107900, IFO 16625, JCM 11238, KCTC 12369, KMM 3525, NBRC 16625

Synonyms
- Reichenbachia agariperforans Reichenbachia agaroperforata

Species of bacterium

Reichenbachiella agariperforans is a gram-negative bacterium from the genus Reichenbachiella which has been isolated from seawater near the Amursky Bay by the Pacific Ocean.
