= Hymenobacter xinjiangensis =

Scientific classification
- Domain: Bacteria
- Kingdom: Pseudomonadati
- Phylum: Bacteroidota
- Class: Cytophagia
- Order: Cytophagales
- Family: Hymenobacteraceae
- Genus: Hymenobacter
- Species: H. xinjiangensis

Binomial name
- Hymenobacter xinjiangensis Zhang et al. 2007

Type strain
- CCTCC AB 206080, CIP 109772, IAM 15452, JCM 23206, X2-1

Species of bacterium

Hymenobacter xinjiangensis is a radiation-resistant, Gram-negative, rod-shaped and non-motile bacterium from the genus Hymenobacter which has been isolated from sand from the desert of Xinjiang in China.
