= Hymenobacter arizonensis =

Scientific classification
- Domain: Bacteria
- Kingdom: Pseudomonadati
- Phylum: Bacteroidota
- Class: Cytophagia
- Order: Cytophagales
- Family: Hymenobacteraceae
- Genus: Hymenobacter
- Species: H. arizonensis

Binomial name
- Hymenobacter arizonensis Reddy and Garcia-Pichel 2013

Type strain
- ATCC BAA-1266, DSM 17870, JCM 13504, OR 362-8

Species of bacterium

Hymenobacter arizonensis is a rod-shaped and non-motile bacterium from the genus Hymenobacter which has been isolated from biological soil crusts at the Colorado Plateau in the United States.
