= Hymenobacter swuensis =

Scientific classification
- Domain: Bacteria
- Kingdom: Pseudomonadati
- Phylum: Bacteroidota
- Class: Cytophagia
- Order: Cytophagales
- Family: Hymenobacteraceae
- Genus: Hymenobacter
- Species: H. swuensis

Binomial name
- Hymenobacter swuensis Lee et al. 2016

Type strain
- DY43, JCM 18582, KCTC 32018

Species of bacterium

Hymenobacter swuensis is a Gram-negative and non-motile bacterium from the genus Hymenobacter which has been isolated from mountain soil.
