= Hymenobacter metalli =

Scientific classification
- Domain: Bacteria
- Kingdom: Pseudomonadati
- Phylum: Bacteroidota
- Class: Cytophagia
- Order: Cytophagales
- Family: Hymenobacteraceae
- Genus: Hymenobacter
- Species: H. metalli

Binomial name
- Hymenobacter metalli Chung et al. 2011

Type strain
- A2-91, CIP 110140, KACC 17381, LMG 25700

Species of bacterium

Hymenobacter metalli is a gram-negative bacterium from the genus Hymenobacter which has been isolated from a uranium mine waste water treatment system.
