= Porifericola rhodea =

Scientific classification
- Domain: Bacteria
- Kingdom: Pseudomonadati
- Phylum: Bacteroidota
- Class: Cytophagia
- Order: Cytophagales
- Family: Flammeovirgaceae
- Genus: Porifericola
- Species: P. rhodea

Binomial name
- Porifericola rhodea Yoon et al. 2011

Type strain
- MBIC08357, NBRC 107748, N5EA6-3A2B

Synonyms
- "Porifericola roseus"

Species of bacterium

"Porifericola rhodea" is a Gram-negative, strictly aerobic, rod-shaped and non-motile bacterium from the genus "Porifericola" which has been isolated from a marine sponge.
