= Marivirga atlantica =

Scientific classification
- Domain: Bacteria
- Kingdom: Pseudomonadati
- Phylum: Bacteroidota
- Class: Cytophagia
- Order: Cytophagales
- Family: Marivirgaceae
- Genus: Marivirga
- Species: M. atlantica

Binomial name
- Marivirga atlantica Lin et al. 2015

Type strain
- CCTCC AB 2014242, JCM 30305, SM1354

Species of bacterium

Marivirga atlantica is a Gram-negative, aerobic and rod-shaped bacterium from the genus Marivirga which has been isolated from the Atlantic Ocean seawater.
