= Hymenobacter gelipurpurascens =

Scientific classification
- Domain: Bacteria
- Kingdom: Pseudomonadati
- Phylum: Bacteroidota
- Class: Cytophagia
- Order: Cytophagales
- Family: Hymenobacteraceae
- Genus: Hymenobacter
- Species: H. gelipurpurascens

Binomial name
- Hymenobacter gelipurpurascens Buczolits et al. 2006

Type strain
- Busse Tx g1, Busse Tx o1, CIP 109676, CIP 109678, DSM 11116, DSM 11117, LMG 21873, LMG 21874, Myx 2105, MyxV2, Tx g1, Tx g1 (MyxV2), Tx o1 (Myx 2105), Txg1, Txo1, Txol1

Synonyms
- Taxeobacter gelupurpurascens

Species of bacterium

Hymenobacter gelipurpurascens is a bacterium from the genus Hymenobacter which has been isolated from soil from Alberta in Canada.
