= Roseivirga marina =

Scientific classification
- Domain: Bacteria
- Kingdom: Pseudomonadati
- Phylum: Bacteroidota
- Class: Cytophagia
- Order: Cytophagales
- Family: Roseivirgaceae
- Genus: Roseivirga
- Species: R. marina

Binomial name
- Roseivirga marina Pan et al. 2015

Type strain
- KCTC 42444, MCCC 1K00459, PSR

Synonyms
- Roseivirga vulgaris

Species of bacterium

Roseivirga marina is a Gram-negative and rod-shaped bacterium from the genus Roseivirga which has been isolated from seawater from the Sea of Japan.
