= Marivirga sericea =

Scientific classification
- Domain: Bacteria
- Kingdom: Pseudomonadati
- Phylum: Bacteroidota
- Class: Cytophagia
- Order: Cytophagales
- Family: Marivirgaceae
- Genus: Marivirga
- Species: M. sericea

Binomial name
- Marivirga sericea (ex Lewin 1969) Nedashkovskaya et al. 2010

Type strain
- ATCC 23182, DMS 4125, DSM 4125, IFO 15983, KCTC 2899, LMG 13021, NBRC 15983, NCIMB 1403, NCMB 1403, SI07

Synonyms
- Microscilla sericea

Species of bacterium

Marivirga sericea is a gram-negative bacterium from the genus Marivirga which has been isolated from marine aquarium outflow in the United States.
