= Thermonema rossianum =

Scientific classification
- Domain: Bacteria
- Kingdom: Pseudomonadati
- Phylum: Bacteroidota
- Class: Cytophagia
- Order: Cytophagales
- Family: Thermonemataceae
- Genus: Thermonema
- Species: T. rossianum

Binomial name
- Thermonema rossianum Nobre et al. 1997 (complete authorship reads: Nobre, Rainey and da Costa)

Type strain
- DSM 10300, NR-27

Species of bacterium

Thermonema rossianum is a thermophilic and halophilic bacterium from the genus Thermonema which has been isolated from a saline hot springs in from the Bay of Naples in Italy.
