= Fulvivirga =

Scientific classification
- Domain: Bacteria
- Kingdom: Pseudomonadati
- Phylum: Bacteroidota
- Class: Cytophagia
- Order: Cytophagales
- Family: Fulvivirgaceae
- Genus: Fulvivirga; Nedashkovskaya et al. 2007

Type species
- Fulvivirga kasyanovii

Species
- Fulvivirga imtechensis Fulvivirga kasyanovii Fulvivirga lutimaris

Genus of bacteria

Fulvivirga is a genus of gram-negative bacteria from the family Fulvivirgaceae.
