= Cesiribacter =

Scientific classification
- Domain: Bacteria
- Kingdom: Pseudomonadati
- Phylum: Bacteroidota
- Class: Cytophagia
- Order: Cytophagales
- Family: Cesiribacteraceae
- Genus: Cesiribacter; Srinivas et al. 2011

Type species
- Cesiribacter andamanensis

Species
- C. andamanensis C. roseus

Genus of bacteria

Cesiribacter is a genus of gram-negative bacteria from the family of Cesiribacteraceae.
