= Persicobacter =

Scientific classification
- Domain: Bacteria
- Kingdom: Pseudomonadati
- Phylum: Bacteroidota
- Class: Cytophagia
- Order: Cytophagales
- Family: Persicobacteraceae
- Genus: Persicobacter; Nakagawa et al. 1997

Type species
- Persicobacter diffluens

Species
- P. diffluens P. psychrovividus

Genus of bacteria

Persicobacter is a Gram-negative, facultatively anaerobic, chemoorganotrophic, and motile genus from the family of Persicobacteraceae.
