= Marivirga tractuosa =

Scientific classification
- Domain: Bacteria
- Kingdom: Pseudomonadati
- Phylum: Bacteroidota
- Class: Cytophagia
- Order: Cytophagales
- Family: Marivirgaceae
- Genus: Marivirga
- Species: M. tractuosa

Binomial name
- Marivirga tractuosa (Lewin 1969) Nedashkovskaya et al. 2010

Type strain
- ATCC 23168, CIP 106410, DSM 4126, H 42.6079, IFO 15989, KCTC 2958, Lewin H43, Lewin R.A H-43, LMG 8378, NBRC 15989, NCIMB 1408, NCMB 1408, R-30342, VKM B-1430

Synonyms
- Flexibacter tractuosus

Species of bacterium

Marivirga tractuosa is a gram-negative bacterium from the genus Marivirga which has been isolated from beach sand from the South China Sea in Nhatrang in Vietnam.
