= Roseivirga halotolerans =

Scientific classification
- Domain: Bacteria
- Kingdom: Pseudomonadati
- Phylum: Bacteroidota
- Class: Cytophagia
- Order: Cytophagales
- Family: Roseivirgaceae
- Genus: Roseivirga
- Species: R. halotolerans

Binomial name
- Roseivirga halotolerans (Lau et al. 2006) García-López et al. 2020

Synonyms
- Fabibacter halotolerans

Species of bacterium

Roseivirga echinicomitans is a Gram-negative, strictly aerobic and chemoorganotrophic bacterium from the genus Roseivirga.
