= Roseivirga maritima =

Scientific classification
- Domain: Bacteria
- Kingdom: Pseudomonadati
- Phylum: Bacteroidota
- Class: Cytophagia
- Order: Cytophagales
- Family: Roseivirgaceae
- Genus: Roseivirga
- Species: R. maritima

Binomial name
- Roseivirga maritima Jung et al. 2016

Type strain
- KCTC 42718, NBRC 111589, GM-5

Species of bacterium

Roseivirga maritima is a Gram-negative and rod-shaped bacterium from the genus Roseivirga which has been isolated from seawater in Korea.
