= Catalinimonas niigatensis =

Scientific classification
- Domain: Bacteria
- Kingdom: Pseudomonadati
- Phylum: Bacteroidota
- Class: Cytophagia
- Order: Cytophagales
- Family: Catalinimonadaceae
- Genus: Catalinimonas
- Species: C. niigatensis

Binomial name
- Catalinimonas niigatensis Yoon et al. 2014

Type strain
- A6F-52

Species of bacterium

Catalinimonas niigatensis is a Gram-negative, strictly aerobic, rod-shaped and non-motile bacterium from the genus Catalinimonas which has been isolated from sediments of a lake.
