= Thermonema lapsum =

Scientific classification
- Domain: Bacteria
- Kingdom: Pseudomonadati
- Phylum: Bacteroidota
- Class: Cytophagia
- Order: Cytophagales
- Family: Thermonemataceae
- Genus: Thermonema
- Species: T. lapsum

Binomial name
- Thermonema lapsum Hudson et al. 1989

Type strain
- 23/9, ATCC 43542, DSM 5718, NCIMB 13422

Species of bacterium

Thermonema lapsum is a Gram-negative and thermophilic bacterium in the genus Thermonema. It has been isolated from a hot spring in Rotorua in New Zealand. Homospermidine and homospermine are its major polyamines.
