= Reichenbachiella =

Scientific classification
- Domain: Bacteria
- Kingdom: Pseudomonadati
- Phylum: Bacteroidota
- Class: Cytophagia
- Order: Cytophagales
- Family: Reichenbachiellaceae
- Genus: Reichenbachiella; Nedashkovskaya et al. 2005

Type species
- Reichenbachiella agariperforans

Species
- Reichenbachiella agariperforans Reichenbachiella faecimaris Reichenbachiella versicolor

Synonyms
- Reichenbachia Nedashkovskaya et al. 2003

Genus of bacteria

Reichenbachiella is a chemoorganotrophic and strictly aerobic genus from the family Reichenbachiellaceae. this bacteria genus is named after the German microbiologist Hans Reichenbach.
