= Marivirga lumbricoides =

Scientific classification
- Domain: Bacteria
- Kingdom: Pseudomonadati
- Phylum: Bacteroidota
- Class: Cytophagia
- Order: Cytophagales
- Family: Marivirgaceae
- Genus: Marivirga
- Species: M. lumbricoides

Binomial name
- Marivirga lumbricoides Xu et al. 2015

Type strain
- CGMCC 1.10832, JCM 18012, JLT2000

Species of bacterium

Marivirga lumbricoides is a Gram-negative, aerobic, rod-shaped and heterotrophic bacterium from the genus Marivirga which has been isolated from water from the South China Sea.
