= Roseivirga ehrenbergii =

Scientific classification
- Domain: Bacteria
- Kingdom: Pseudomonadati
- Phylum: Bacteroidota
- Class: Cytophagia
- Order: Cytophagales
- Family: Roseivirgaceae
- Genus: Roseivirga
- Species: R. ehrenbergii

Binomial name
- Roseivirga ehrenbergii Nedashkovskaya et al. 2005

Type strain
- JCM 13514, KCTC 12282, KMM 6017, LMG 22567

Synonyms
- Marinicola seohaensis Yoon et al. 2005; Roseivirga seohaensis (Yoon et al. 2005) Lau et al. 2006; Roseivirga seohaensis (Yoon et al. 2005) Selvaratnam et al. 2016

Species of bacterium

Roseivirga ehrenbergii is a Gram-negative, heterotrophic, strictly aerobic and non-motile bacterium from the genus Roseivirga which has been isolated from the green alga Ulva fenestrata from the Sea of Japan.
