= Hymenobacter =

Scientific classification
- Domain: Bacteria
- Kingdom: Pseudomonadati
- Phylum: Bacteroidota
- Class: Cytophagia
- Order: Cytophagales
- Family: Hymenobacteraceae
- Genus: Hymenobacter; Hirsch et al. 1999

Type species
- Hymenobacter roseosalivarius

Species
- See text

Synonyms
- Taxeobacter

Genus of bacteria

Hymenobacter is a Gram-negative and non-motile bacterial genus from the family Hymenobacteraceae.

== Species ==
Hymenobacter comprises the following species:

H. actinosclerus
H. aerophilus
H. algoricola
H. antarcticus
H. aquaticus
H. aquatilis
H. arcticus
H. arizonensis
H. artigasi
H. cavernae
H. chitinivorans
H. coalescens
H. coccineus
H. daecheongensis
H. daeguensis
H. defluvii
H. deserti
H. elongatus
H. fastidiosus
H. flocculans
H. frigidus
H. gelipurpurascens
H. ginsengisoli
H. glacialis
H. glaciei
H. glacieicola
H. gummosus
H. kanuolensis
H. koreensis
H. lapidarius
H. latericoloratus
H. luteus
H. marinus
H. metalli
H. monticola
H. mucosus
H. nivis
H. norwichensis
H. ocellatus
H. pallidus
H. paludis
H. pedocola
H. perfusus
H. psychrophilus
H. psychrotolerans
H. qilianensis
H. rigui
H. rivuli
H. roseosalivarius
H. roseus
H. ruber
H. rubidus
H. rubripertinctus
H. rufus
H. rutilus
H. saemangeumensis
H. sedentarius
H. seoulensis
H. soli
H. swuensis
H. tenuis
H. terrae
H. terrenus
H. tibetensis
H. wooponensis
H. xinjiangensis
H. yonginensis
