= Roseivirga spongicola =

Scientific classification
- Domain: Bacteria
- Kingdom: Pseudomonadati
- Phylum: Bacteroidota
- Class: Cytophagia
- Order: Cytophagales
- Family: Roseivirgaceae
- Genus: Roseivirga
- Species: R. spongicola

Binomial name
- Roseivirga spongicola Lau et al. 2006

Type strain
- JCM 13337, NRRL B-41219, UST030701-084

Species of bacterium

Roseivirga spongicola is a Gram-negative, strictly aerobic and chemoorganotrophic bacterium from the genus Roseivirga which has been isolated from a marine sponge on the Bahamas.
