= Nafulsella =

Scientific classification
- Domain: Bacteria
- Kingdom: Pseudomonadati
- Phylum: Bacteroidota
- Class: Cytophagia
- Order: Cytophagales
- Family: Cesiribacteraceae
- Genus: Nafulsella; Zhang et al. 2013

Type species
- Nafulsella turpanensis

Species
- N. turpanensis

Genus of bacteria

Nafulsella is a genus from the family of Cesiribacteraceae with one known species (Nafulsella turpanensis).
