= Hymenobacter tibetensis =

Scientific classification
- Domain: Bacteria
- Kingdom: Pseudomonadati
- Phylum: Bacteroidota
- Class: Cytophagia
- Order: Cytophagales
- Family: Hymenobacteraceae
- Genus: Hymenobacter
- Species: H. tibetensis

Binomial name
- Hymenobacter tibetensis Dai et al. 2014

Type strain
- CCTCC AB 207089, XTM003, NRRL B-51271

Species of bacterium

Hymenobacter tibetensis is an UV-resistant bacterium from the genus Hymenobacter which has been isolated from the Qinghai-Tibet plateau in China.
