= Hymenobacter terrenus =

Scientific classification
- Domain: Bacteria
- Kingdom: Pseudomonadati
- Phylum: Bacteroidota
- Class: Cytophagia
- Order: Cytophagales
- Family: Hymenobacteraceae
- Genus: Hymenobacter
- Species: H. terrenus

Binomial name
- Hymenobacter terrenus Tang et al. 2015

Species of bacterium

Hymenobacter terrenus is a Gram-negative, non-spore-forming, short rod-shaped and non-motile bacterium from the genus Hymenobacter. It has been isolated from biological soil crusts from Liangcheng, Inner Mongolia.
