= C13H25N9O3 =

The molecular formula C_{13}H_{25}N_{9}O_{3} (molar mass: 355.403 g/mol, exact mass: 355.2080 u) may refer to:

- TAN-1057_A
- TAN-1057_C
