= Ekhidna lutea =

Ekhidna

Scientific classification
- Domain: Bacteria
- Phylum: Bacteroidota
- Class: Cytophagia
- Order: Cytophagales
- Family: Reichenbachiellaceae
- Genus: Ekhidna Alain et al. 2010
- Species: E. lutea

Binomial name
- Ekhidna lutea Alain et al. 2010

Type strain
- BiosLi/39; CIP 109600; DSM 19307; OOB 398

Family of bacteria

Ekhidna lutea is a species of gram-negative bacterium in the phylum Bacteroidota.
