= Botryobacter =

Scientific classification
- Domain: Bacteria
- Kingdom: Pseudomonadati
- Phylum: Bacteroidota
- Class: Cytophagia
- Order: Cytophagales
- Family: Hymenobacteraceae
- Genus: Botryobacter; Han et al. 2019
- Species: B. ruber

Binomial name
- Botryobacter ruber Han et al. 2019

Genus of bacteria

Botryobacter is a Gram-negative and rod-shaped bacterial genus from the family of Hymenobacteraceae with one known species (Botryobacter ruber). Botryobacter ruber has been isolated from soil from the Gurbantunggut Desert.
