= Roseivirga thermotolerans =

Scientific classification
- Domain: Bacteria
- Kingdom: Pseudomonadati
- Phylum: Bacteroidota
- Class: Cytophagia
- Order: Cytophagales
- Family: Roseivirgaceae
- Genus: Roseivirga
- Species: R. thermotolerans

Binomial name
- Roseivirga thermotolerans (Tang et al. 2016) García-López et al. 2020

Type strain
- A4

Synonyms
- Fabivirga thermotolerans

Species of bacterium

Roseivirga thermotolerans is a Gram-negative, strictly aerobic and non-spore-forming bacterium from the genus Roseivirga.
