= Roseivirga pacifica =

Scientific classification
- Domain: Bacteria
- Kingdom: Pseudomonadati
- Phylum: Bacteroidota
- Class: Cytophagia
- Order: Cytophagales
- Family: Roseivirgaceae
- Genus: Roseivirga
- Species: R. pacifica

Binomial name
- Roseivirga pacifica (Huo et al. 2013) García-López et al. 2020

Synonyms
- Fabibacter pacificus

Species of bacterium

Roseivirga pacifica is a Gram-negative, aerobic and moderately halophilic bacterium from the genus Roseivirga which has been isolated from seawater from a depth of 2672 m from the Pacific Ocean.
