= Catalinimonas alkaloidigena =

Scientific classification
- Domain: Bacteria
- Kingdom: Pseudomonadati
- Phylum: Bacteroidota
- Class: Cytophagia
- Order: Cytophagales
- Family: Catalinimonadaceae
- Genus: Catalinimonas
- Species: C. alkaloidigena

Binomial name
- Catalinimonas alkaloidigena Choi et al. 2013

Type strain
- CNU-914

Species of bacterium

Catalinimonas alkaloidigena is a Gram-negative and aerobic bacterium from the genus Catalinimonas.
