= Bernardetia =

Scientific classification
- Domain: Bacteria
- Kingdom: Pseudomonadati
- Phylum: Bacteroidota
- Class: Cytophagia
- Order: Cytophagales
- Family: Bernardetiaceae
- Genus: Bernardetia; Hahnke et al. 2017

Type species
- Bernardetia litoralis

Species
- B. litoralis

Family of bacteria

Bernardetia is a bacterial genus from the family Bernardetiaceae with one known species (Bernardetia litoralis). Flexibacter litoralis has been reclassified to Bernardetia litoralis.
