= Roseivirga echinicomitans =

Scientific classification
- Domain: Bacteria
- Kingdom: Pseudomonadati
- Phylum: Bacteroidota
- Class: Cytophagia
- Order: Cytophagales
- Family: Roseivirgaceae
- Genus: Roseivirga
- Species: R. echinicomitans

Binomial name
- Roseivirga echinicomitans Nedashkovskaya et al. 2005

Type strain
- KCTC 12370, KMM 6058, LMG 22587

Species of bacterium

Roseivirga echinicomitans is a species of Gram-negative bacteria that belongs to the family Roseivirgaceae. It is a strictly aerobic, heterotrophic, pink-pigmented, non-motile bacterium from the genus Roseivirga. It was first isolated from the sea urchin Strongylocentrotus intermedius.

Roseivirga echinicomitans is an aerobic bacterium that is capable of degrading a variety of organic compounds. Its cells are long, slender, and have a filamentous shape. The bacteria produce pink-pigmented colonies on marine agar.

The ecology and role of R. echinicomitans in marine environments is not well understood, but it has been suggested that it may play a role in the decomposition of organic matter in marine sediments.

The genome of R. echinicomitans has been sequenced and analyzed, providing insights into the bacterium's metabolism and adaptation to its environment.
