= Roseivirga misakiensis =

Scientific classification
- Domain: Bacteria
- Kingdom: Pseudomonadati
- Phylum: Bacteroidota
- Class: Cytophagia
- Order: Cytophagales
- Family: Roseivirgaceae
- Genus: Roseivirga
- Species: R. misakiensis

Binomial name
- Roseivirga misakiensis (Wong et al. 2015) García-López et al. 2020

Synonyms
- Fabibacter misakiensis

Species of bacterium

Roseivirga misakiensis is a Gram-negative, aerobic and slightly curved-rod-shaped bacterium from the genus Roseivirga which has been isolated from coastal surface water of Misaki in Japan.
