= Thermonema =

Scientific classification
- Domain: Bacteria
- Kingdom: Pseudomonadati
- Phylum: Bacteroidota
- Class: Cytophagia
- Order: Cytophagales
- Family: Thermonemataceae; Munoz et al. 2016
- Genus: Thermonema; Hudson et al. 1989

Type species
- Thermonema lapsum Hudson et al. 1989

Species
- Thermonema lapsum Hudson et al. 1989; Thermonema rossianum Nobre et al. 1997

Genus of bacteria

Thermonema is a Gram-negative, chemoheterotrophic and aerobic genus from the phylum Bacteroidota.
