= Thermoflexibacter =

Scientific classification
- Domain: Bacteria
- Kingdom: Pseudomonadati
- Phylum: Bacteroidota
- Class: Cytophagia
- Order: Cytophagales
- Family: Thermoflexibacteraceae
- Genus: Thermoflexibacter; Hahnke et al. 2017
- Species: T. ruber

Binomial name
- Thermoflexibacter ruber (Lewin 1969) Hahnke et al. 2017

Type strain
- ATCC 23103; DSM 9560; GEY; IFO 16677; LMG 13857; NBRC 16677

Synonyms
- Flexibacter ruber Lewin 1969 (Approved Lists 1980)

Genus of bacteria

Thermoflexibacter ruber is a species of bacteria. It is the only species in the genus Thermoflexibacter.
