= Marivic =

Marivic is a Filipino name derived from the names María and Victoria which may refer to:

- Marivic Co-Pilar (born 1971), Filipino politician
- Marivic Velaine Meneses (born 1995), Filipino volleyball player

== See also ==
- Marivirga
