= Bernardetiaceae =

Scientific classification
- Domain: Bacteria
- Kingdom: Pseudomonadati
- Phylum: Bacteroidota
- Class: Cytophagia
- Order: Cytophagales
- Family: Bernardetiaceae; Hahnke et al. 2017

Genera
- Bernardetia Hahnke et al. 2017; Garritya Hahnke et al. 2017; Hugenholtzia Hahnke et al. 2017

Family of bacteria

Bernardetiaceae is a family of gram-negative bacteria in the phylum Bacteroidota.
