= Mooreia =

Mooreia alkaloidigena

Scientific classification
- Domain: Bacteria
- Kingdom: Pseudomonadati
- Phylum: Bacteroidota
- Class: Cytophagia
- Order: Cytophagales
- Family: Mooreiaceae; Choi et al. 2013
- Genus: Mooreia; Choi et al. 2013
- Species: M. alkaloidigena

Binomial name
- Mooreia alkaloidigena Choi et al. 2013

Type strain
- CNX-216; DSM 25186; KCCM 90102

Genus of bacteria

Mooreia alkaloidigena is a species of gram-negative bacteria. It is the only species in the genus Mooreia and family Mooreiaceae.
