= Catalinimonas =

Scientific classification
- Domain: Bacteria
- Kingdom: Pseudomonadati
- Phylum: Bacteroidota
- Class: Cytophagia
- Order: Cytophagales
- Family: Catalinimonadaceae corrig. Choi et al. 2013
- Genus: Catalinimonas; Choi et al. 2013

Species
- Catalinimonas alkaloidigena Choi et al. 2013; Catalinimonas niigatensis Yoon et al. 2014

Genus of bacteria

Catalinimonas is a genus of gram-negative bacteria. It is the only genus in the family Catalinimonadaceae.
