= Roseivirga =

Scientific classification
- Domain: Bacteria
- Kingdom: Pseudomonadati
- Phylum: Bacteroidota
- Class: Cytophagia
- Order: Cytophagales
- Family: Roseivirgaceae; García-López et al. 2020
- Genus: Roseivirga; Nedashkovskaya et al. 2005

Type species
- Roseivirga ehrenbergii Nedashkovskaya et al. 2005

Species
- Roseivirga echinicomitans Roseivirga ehrenbergii Roseivirga halotolerans Roseivirga marina Roseivirga maritima Roseivirga misakiensis Roseivirga pacifica Roseivirga spongicola Roseivirga thermotolerans

Synonyms
- Fabibacter Lau et al. 2006; Fabivirga Tang et al. 2016; Marinicola Yoon et al. 2005

Genus of bacteria

Roseivirga is a strictly aerobic genus of gram-negative bacteria from the phylum Bacteroidota.
