= Dolophrades punctatus =

Scientific classification
- Kingdom: Animalia
- Phylum: Arthropoda
- Class: Insecta
- Order: Coleoptera
- Suborder: Polyphaga
- Infraorder: Cucujiformia
- Family: Cerambycidae
- Genus: Dolophrades
- Species: D. punctatus

Binomial name
- Dolophrades punctatus (Pic, 1934)

Species of beetle

Dolophrades punctatus is a species of beetle in the family Cerambycidae. It was described by Maurice Pic in 1934.
