= Dolophrades =

Scientific classification
- Domain: Eukaryota
- Kingdom: Animalia
- Phylum: Arthropoda
- Class: Insecta
- Order: Coleoptera
- Suborder: Polyphaga
- Infraorder: Cucujiformia
- Family: Cerambycidae
- Tribe: Morimopsini
- Genus: Dolophrades

Genus of beetles

Dolophrades is a genus of longhorn beetles of the subfamily Lamiinae, containing the following species:

- Dolophrades birmanus Breuning, 1958
- Dolophrades mustanganus Holzschuh, 2003
- Dolophrades punctatus Bates, 1884
- Dolophrades terrenus (Pic, 1934)
