= Porifericola =

Scientific classification
- Domain: Bacteria
- Kingdom: Pseudomonadati
- Phylum: Bacteroidota
- Class: Cytophagia
- Order: Cytophagales
- Family: Flammeovirgaceae
- Genus: Porifericola; Yoon et al. 2011

Species
- "P. rhodea"

Genus of bacteria

"Porifericola" is a genus of gram-negative bacteria from the family Flammeovirgaceae with one known species ("Porifericola rhodea").
