= Wensu Town =

Wensu Town 温宿镇 ئونسۇ بازىرى
- Town
- Location in Xinjiang
- Coordinates: 41°16′31″N 80°14′27″E
- Country: People's Republic of China
- Autonomous region: Xinjiang
- Prefecture: Aksu
- County: Wensu

Population (2010)
  - Total: 42,712

Ethnic groups
  - Major ethnic groups: Uyghur
- Time zone: UTC+8 (China Standard)

Wensu Town (Chinese: 温宿镇) is a town and the county seat of Wensu County, in the Aksu Prefecture of Xinjiang, China.

== See also ==
- List of township-level divisions of Xinjiang
