= TAN-1057 A =

TAN-1057 (A, B)
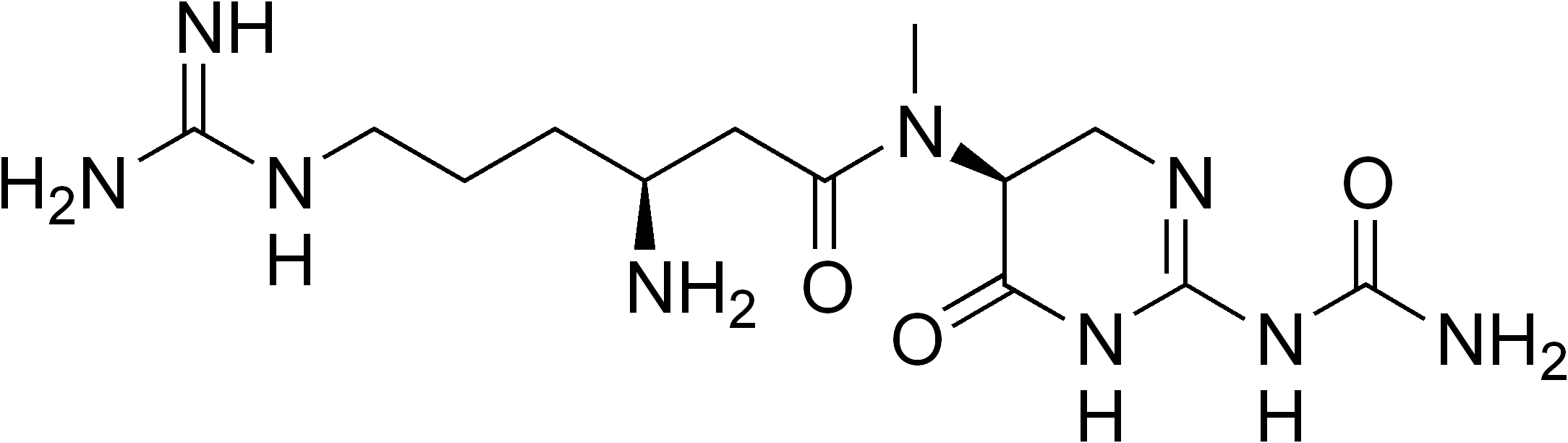
- TAN-1057 A

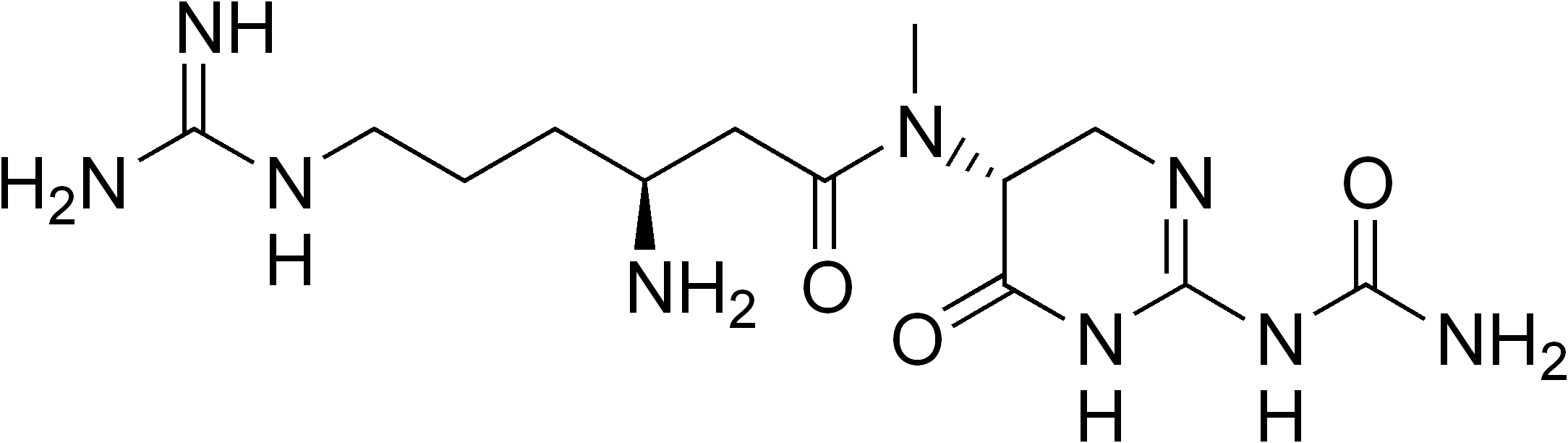
- TAN-1057 B

Identifiers
CAS Number	128126-44-3 (TAN-1057 A); 128126-45-4 (TAN-1057 B)
3D model (JSmol)	Interactive image
ChemSpider	110872
PubChem CID	124498
UNII	74EKN36H9V
CompTox Dashboard (EPA)	DTXSID20926076
- InChI: InChI=1S/C13H25N9O3/c1-22(8-6-19-13(20-10(8)24)21-12(17)25)9(23)5-7(14)3-2-4-18-11(15)16/h7-8H,2-6,14H2,1H3,(H4,15,16,18)(H4,17,19,20,21,24,25)/t7-,8+/m0/s1 Key: ZMWBCGMRXBPXEU-JGVFFNPUSA-N; InChI=1/C13H25N9O3/c1-22(8-6-19-13(20-10(8)24)21-12(17)25)9(23)5-7(14)3-2-4-18-11(15)16/h7-8H,2-6,14H2,1H3,(H4,15,16,18)(H4,17,19,20,21,24,25)/t7-,8+/m0/s1 Key: ZMWBCGMRXBPXEU-JGVFFNPUBF
- SMILES: O=C1N\C(=N/C[C@H]1N(C(=O)C[C@@H](N)CCC/N=C(\N)N)C)NC(=O)N

Properties
Chemical formula	C_{13}H_{25}N_{9}O_{3}
Molar mass	355.403 g·mol^{−1}
- Except where otherwise noted, data are given for materials in their standard state (at 25 °C [77 °F], 100 kPa). verify (what is ?) Infobox references

TAN-1057 A and TAN-1057 B are organic compounds found in the Flexibacter sp. PK-74 bacterium. TAN-1057 A and B are closely related structurally as diastereomers. Also related are TAN-1057 C and TAN-1057 D, isolated from the same bacteria. The four compounds have been shown to be an effective antibiotics against methicillin-resistant strains of Staphylococcus aureus which act through the inhibition of protein biosynthesis.
