= TAN-1057 C =

TAN-1057 C and TAN-1057 D
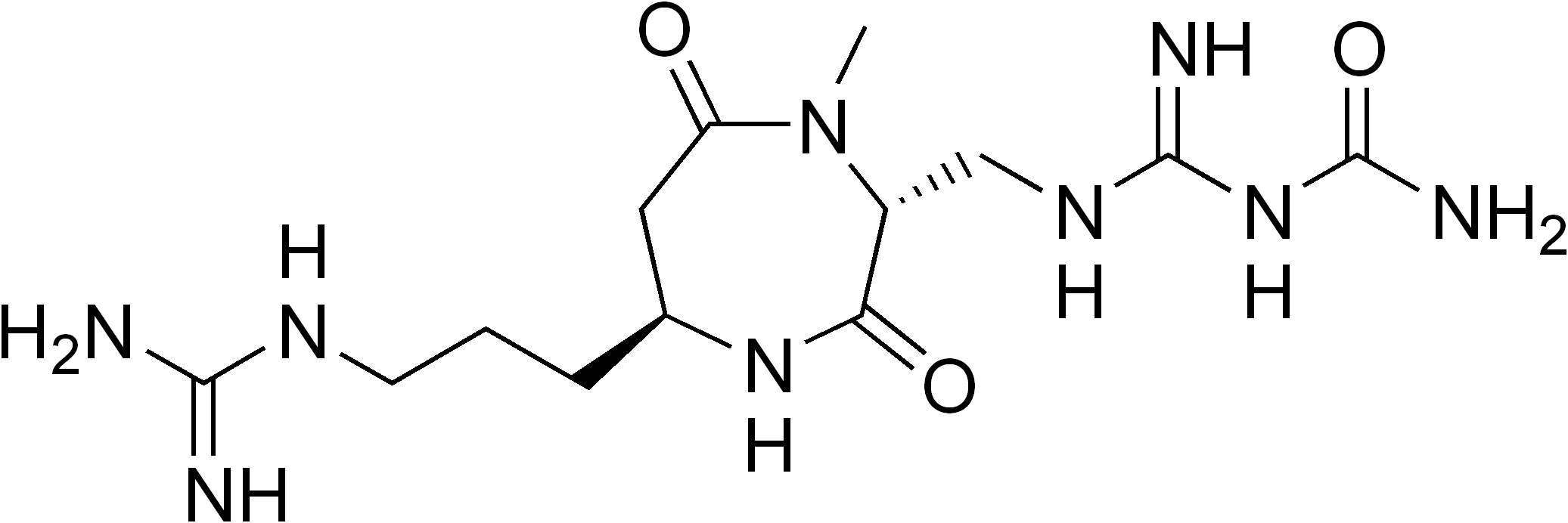
- TAN-1057 C

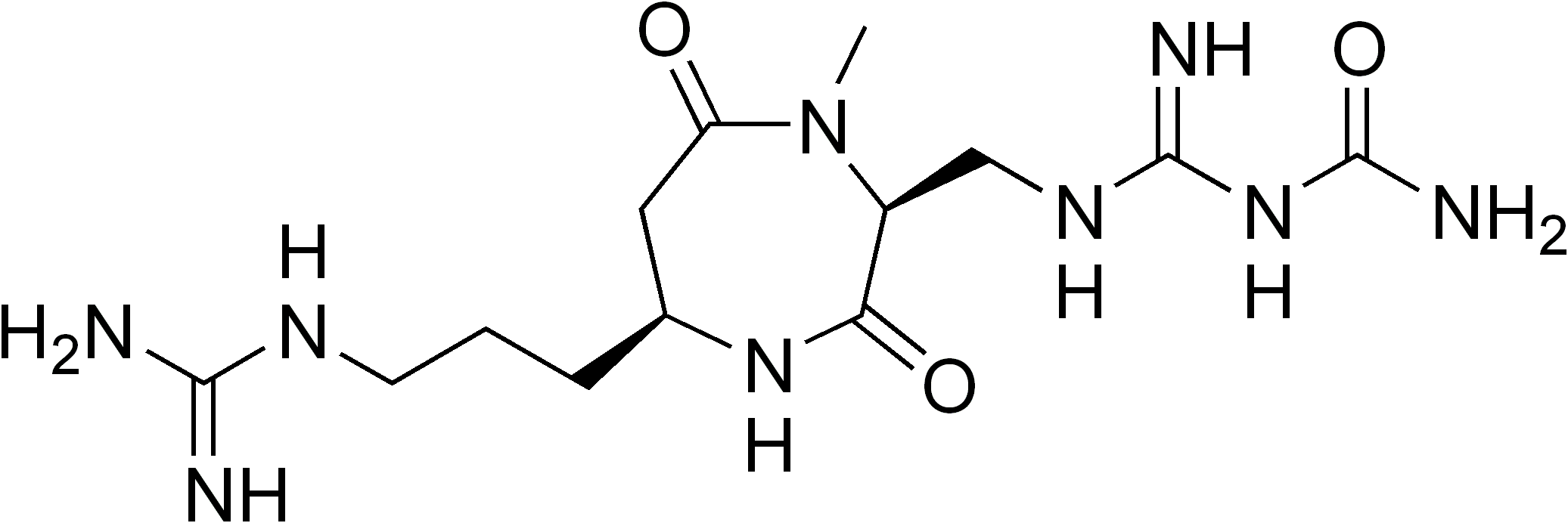
- TAN-1057 D

Identifiers
| CAS Number | 128126-46-5 (TAN-1057 C); 128126-47-6 (TAN-1057 D) |
| 3D model (JSmol) | Interactive image |
| ChemSpider | 7851330 |
| PubChem CID | 9576889 |
| UNII | 7TWX2V5P6Q |
| CompTox Dashboard (EPA) | DTXSID90155816 |
- InChI: InChI=1S/C13H25N9O3/c1-22-9(6-19-20-7-18-13(16)25)11(24)21-8(5-10(22)23)3-2-4-17-12(14)15/h7-9,19H,2-6H2,1H3,(H,21,24)(H4,14,15,17)(H3,16,18,20,25)/t8-,9+/m0/s1 Key: PNFFUPQADHHLMN-DTWKUNHWSA-N; InChI=1/C13H25N9O3/c1-22-9(6-19-20-7-18-13(16)25)11(24)21-8(5-10(22)23)3-2-4-17-12(14)15/h7-9,19H,2-6H2,1H3,(H,21,24)(H4,14,15,17)(H3,16,18,20,25)/t8-,9+/m0/s1 Key: PNFFUPQADHHLMN-DTWKUNHWBI
- SMILES: O=C1N(C)[C@@H](C(=O)N[C@H](C1)CCC/N=C(\N)N)CNN\C=N\C(=O)N

Properties
| Chemical formula | C_{13}H_{25}N_{9}O_{3} |
| Molar mass | 355.403 g·mol^{−1} |
- Except where otherwise noted, data are given for materials in their standard state (at 25 °C [77 °F], 100 kPa). verify (what is ?) Infobox references

TAN-1057 C and TAN-1057 D are organic compounds found in the Flexibacter sp. PK-74 bacterium. TAN-1057 C and D are closely related structurally as diastereomers. Also related are TAN-1057 A and TAN-1057 B, isolated from the same bacteria. The four compounds have been shown to be an effective antibiotics against methicillin-resistant strains of Staphylococcus aureus which act through the inhibition of protein biosynthesis.
