= Microscillaceae =

Scientific classification
- Domain: Bacteria
- Kingdom: Pseudomonadati
- Phylum: Bacteroidota
- Class: Cytophagia
- Order: Cytophagales
- Family: Microscillaceae; Hahnke et al. 2017

Genera
- Eisenibacter Hahnke et al. 2017; Microscilla Pringsheim 1951 (Approved Lists 1980)

Family of bacteria

Microscillaceae is a family of gram-negative bacteria in the phylum Bacteroidota.
