= Dolophrades mustanganus =

Scientific classification
- Domain: Eukaryota
- Kingdom: Animalia
- Phylum: Arthropoda
- Class: Insecta
- Order: Coleoptera
- Suborder: Polyphaga
- Infraorder: Cucujiformia
- Family: Cerambycidae
- Genus: Dolophrades
- Species: D. mustanganus

Binomial name
- Dolophrades mustanganus Holzschuh, 2003

Species of beetle

Dolophrades mustanganus is a species of beetle in the family Cerambycidae. It was described by Holzschuh in 2003.
