= Raineya =

Scientific classification
- Domain: Bacteria
- Kingdom: Pseudomonadati
- Phylum: Bacteroidota
- Class: Cytophagia
- Order: Cytophagales
- Family: Raineyaceae; Albuquerque et al. 2018
- Genus: Raineya; Albuquerque et al. 2018
- Species: R. orbicola

Binomial name
- Raineya orbicola Albuquerque et al. 2018

Type strain
- CECT 9012; LMG 29233; SPSPC-11

Genus of bacteria

Raineya orbicola is a species of bacteria in the phylum Bacteroidota. It is the only species in the genus Raineya and family Raineyaceae.
