= Persicobacteraceae =

Scientific classification
- Domain: Bacteria
- Kingdom: Pseudomonadati
- Phylum: Bacteroidota
- Class: Cytophagia
- Order: Cytophagales
- Family: Persicobacteraceae; Munoz et al. 2016

Genera
- Aureibacter Yoon et al. 2011; Fulvitalea Haber et al. 2013; Persicobacter Nakagawa et al. 1997

Family of bacteria

Persicobacteraceae is a family of gram-negative bacteria in the phylum Bacteroidota.
