= Marivirga =

Scientific classification
- Domain: Bacteria
- Kingdom: Pseudomonadati
- Phylum: Bacteroidota
- Class: Cytophagia
- Order: Cytophagales
- Family: Marivirgaceae; García-López et al. 2020
- Genus: Marivirga; Nedashkovskaya et al. 2010

Species
- Marivirga atlantica Lin et al. 2015; Marivirga harenae Muramatsu et al. 2017; Marivirga lumbricoides Xu et al. 2015; Marivirga sericea (ex Lewin 1969) Nedashkovskaya et al. 2010; Marivirga tractuosa (Lewin 1969) Nedashkovskaya et al. 2010

Genus of bacteria

Marivirga is a genus from the phylum Bacteroidota.
