= Dolophrades terrenus =

Scientific classification
- Domain: Eukaryota
- Kingdom: Animalia
- Phylum: Arthropoda
- Class: Insecta
- Order: Coleoptera
- Suborder: Polyphaga
- Infraorder: Cucujiformia
- Family: Cerambycidae
- Genus: Dolophrades
- Species: D. terrenus

Binomial name
- Dolophrades terrenus Bates, 1884

Species of beetle

Dolophrades terrenus is a species of beetle in the family Cerambycidae. It was described by Henry Walter Bates in 1884. It is known from Japan.
