= Fulvivirgaceae =

Scientific classification
- Domain: Bacteria
- Kingdom: Pseudomonadati
- Phylum: Bacteroidota
- Class: Cytophagia
- Order: Cytophagales
- Family: Fulvivirgaceae; García-López et al. 2020

Genera
- Chryseolinea Kim et al. 2013; Fulvivirga Nedashkovskaya et al. 2007; Ohtaekwangia Yoon et al. 2011

Family of bacteria

Fulvivirgaceae is a family of bacteria in the phylum Bacteroidota.
