= Wensu County =

Wensu County: 温宿县 (Chinese); ئونسۇ ناھىيىسى (Uyghur); Onsu, Kona Shahr, Wensuh
- County
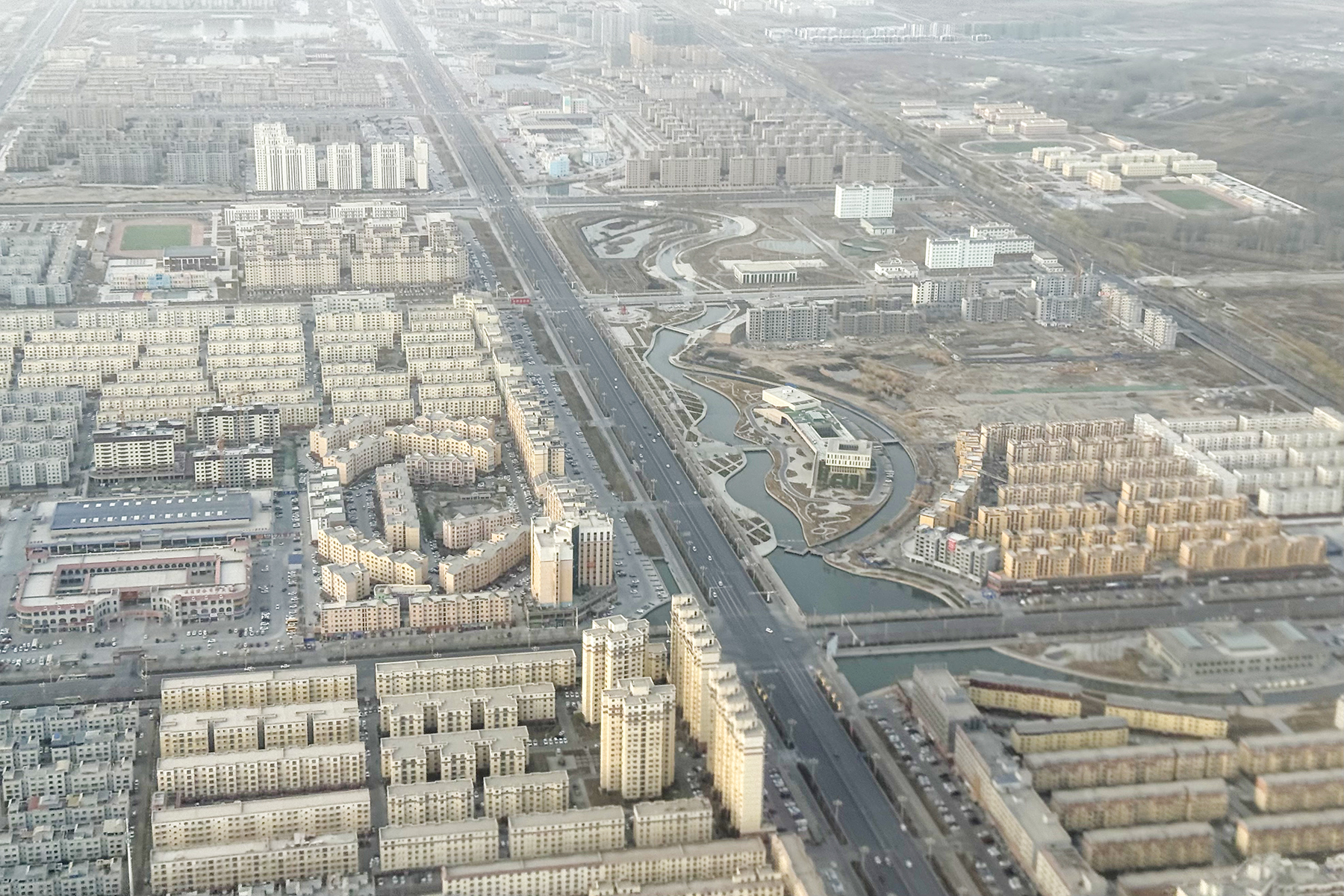
- Aerial view of Wensu County in 2024

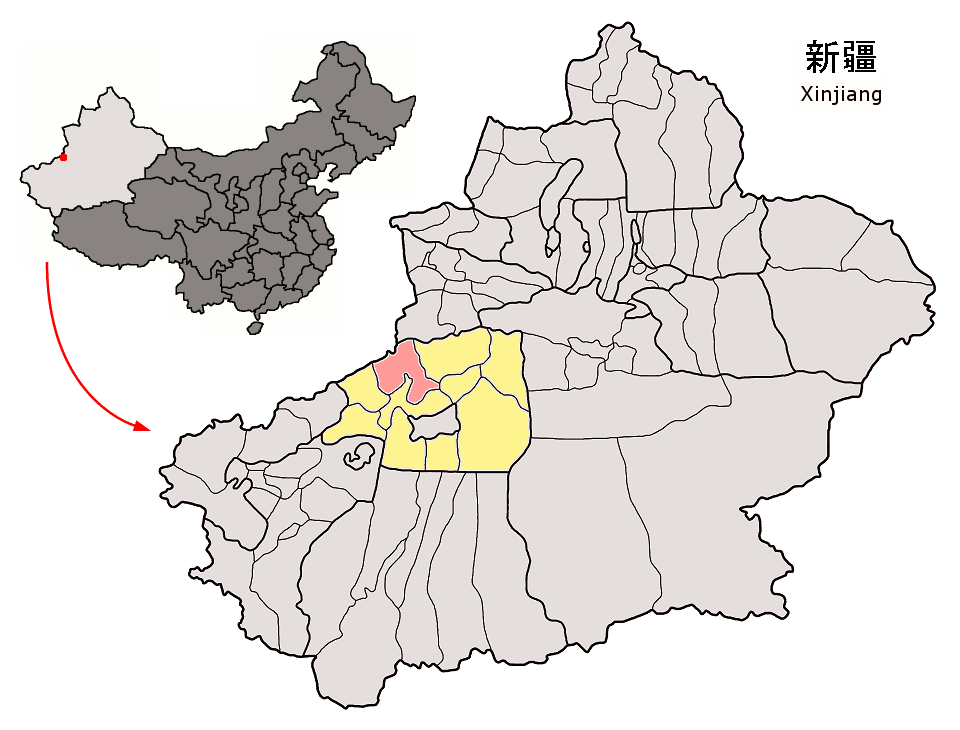
- Location of Wensu County (red) within Aksu Prefecture (yellow) and Xinjiang

- Location of the seat Wensu County (China)
- Coordinates: 41°15′N 80°14′E
- Country: China
- Autonomous region: Xinjiang
- Prefecture: Aksu
- County seat: Wensu Town

Area
  - Total: 14,335.16 km^{2} (5,534.84 sq mi)

Population (2020)
  - Total: 266,002
  - Density: 18.5559/km^{2} (48.0596/sq mi)

Ethnic groups
  - Major ethnic groups: Uyghur
- Time zone: UTC+8 (China Standard (Note: Locals in Xinjiang frequently observe UTC+6 (Xinjiang Time), 2 hours behind Beijing.))
- Postal code: 843100
- Website: www.wszf.gov.cn (in Chinese)

Wensu County

Chinese name
- Simplified Chinese: 温宿县
- Traditional Chinese: 溫宿縣
Transcriptions
Standard Mandarin
- Hanyu Pinyin: Wēnsù Xiàn
- Wade–Giles: Wên¹-su⁴ Hsien⁴

Uyghur name
- Uyghur: ئونسۇ ناھىيىسى
Transcriptions
- Latin Yëziqi: Onsu Nahiyisi
- Yengi Yeziⱪ: Onsu Naⱨiyisi
- SASM/GNC: Onsu Nahiyisi
- Siril Yëziqi: Онсу Наһийиси

Wensu County (Chinese: 温宿县), also known as Onsu County (Uyghur: ئونسۇ ناھىيىسى, romanized: Onsu Nahiyisi), is a county in the Xinjiang Uygur Autonomous Region of China, under the administration of Aksu Prefecture, bordering Kyrgyzstan's Issyk-Kul Region to the northwest. It has an area of 14,309 km^{2} (5,525 sq mi).

== Etymology ==
The toponym Wensu (温宿) had appeared in historical records of the Western Han Dynasty as one of the 36 states in the Western Regions. The name 'Onsu' means "ten rivers" in Uyghur and other Turkic languages. The name is similar to that of the nearby Zhetysu region which means "seven rivers"- both names consist of a number followed by 'su' (river; water). The name Aksu is Turkic for 'white water'.

In Uyghur, the county is called Aksu Konaxahar (阿克苏阔纳协海尔) meaning 'the old city of Aksu'.

== History ==
Wensu County was established in 1902.

On May 29, 1958, Wensu County was eliminated and its territory made part of Aksu County. In 1962, Wensu County was restored.

In a Radio Free Asia interview, a Han Chinese staffer in the Wensu County local government said that in July 2017, a policy to affix QR codes to all knives belonging to Uyghurs was being carried out.

As of March 2018, every cadre in the county was required to spend eight days a month at the home of villagers.

In the late 2010s, Wensu County was the site of vocational education and training centers (also understood as deradicalization centers, re-education camps or concentration camps). According to a Radio Free Asia interview with an officer at the Wensu county police station, as of August 2018, 30,000 persons, or about one in six Uyghurs in the county (approximately 16% of the overall population of the county), were detained in re-education camps.

== Administrative divisions ==
Wensu County administered 8 towns, 4 townships, and 1 ethnic township.

Name	Simplified Chinese	Hanyu Pinyin	Uyghur (UEY)	Uyghur Latin (ULY)	Administrative division code	Notes
Towns
Onsu Town (Wensu Town)	温宿镇	Wēnsù Zhèn	ئونسۇ بازىرى	Onsu baziri	652922100	
Tumxuk Town	吐木秀克镇	Tǔmùxiùkè Zhèn	تۇمشۇق بازىرى	tumshuq baziri	652922101	formerly Tumxuk Township (吐木秀克乡)
Qizil Town	克孜勒镇	Tǔmùxiùkè Zhèn	قىزىل بازىرى	qizil baziri	652922102	formerly Qizil Township (克孜勒乡)
Aral Town	阿热勒镇	Ārèlè Zhèn	ئارال بازىرى	Aral baziri	652922103	formerly Aral Township (阿热勒乡)
Jam Town	佳木镇	Jiāmù Zhèn	جام بازىرى	jam baziri	652922104	formerly Jam Township (佳木乡)
Topkhan Town	托甫汗镇	Tuōfǔhàn Zhèn	توپقان بازىرى	topqan baziri	652922105	
Komsumul Town	共青团镇	Gòngqīngtuán Zhèn	كومسۇمۇل بازىرى	komsumul baziri	652922106	
Kökyar Town	柯柯牙镇	Kēkēyá Zhèn	كۆكيار بازىرى	kökyar baziri	652922107	
Townships
Toxula Township	托乎拉乡	Tuōhūlā Xiāng	توخۇلا يېزىسى	toxula yëzisi	652922200	
Chaghraq Township	恰格拉克乡	Qiàgélākè Xiāng	چاغراق يېزىسى	chaghraq yëzisi	652922202	
Ishlemchi Township	依希来木其乡	Yīxīláimùqí Xiāng	ئىشلەمچى يېزىسى	Ishlemchi yëzisi	652922204	
Gulawat Township (Gule Awati)	古勒阿瓦提乡	Gǔlè'āwǎtí Xiāng	گۈلئاۋات يېزىسى	gül'awat yëzisi	652922206	
Ethnic township
Bozdong Kyrgyz Ethnic Township	博孜墩柯尔克孜族乡	Bózīdūn Kē'ěrkèzīzú Xiāng	بوزدۆڭ قىرغىز يېزىسى	bozdöng qirghiz yëzisi	652922207	(Kyrgyz) بوزدۅڭ قىرعىز ايىلى; Боздөң Кыргыз айылы

== Climate ==
Climate data for Onsu, elevation 1,133 m (3,717 ft), (1991–2020 normals, extremes 1991–present)
Month	Jan	Feb	Mar	Apr	May	Jun	Jul	Aug	Sep	Oct	Nov	Dec	Year
Record high °C (°F)	8.1 (46.6)	17.1 (62.8)	26.8 (80.2)	34.6 (94.3)	34.7 (94.5)	37.0 (98.6)	39.6 (103.3)	38.2 (100.8)	35.6 (96.1)	29.0 (84.2)	23.0 (73.4)	9.8 (49.6)	39.6 (103.3)
Mean daily maximum °C (°F)	−1.0 (30.2)	5.3 (41.5)	14.2 (57.6)	22.4 (72.3)	26.8 (80.2)	29.9 (85.8)	31.3 (88.3)	30.2 (86.4)	26.2 (79.2)	19.4 (66.9)	9.8 (49.6)	0.8 (33.4)	17.9 (64.3)
Daily mean °C (°F)	−7.3 (18.9)	−1.1 (30.0)	8.0 (46.4)	15.8 (60.4)	20.2 (68.4)	23.1 (73.6)	24.4 (75.9)	23.2 (73.8)	18.9 (66.0)	11.7 (53.1)	2.9 (37.2)	−4.9 (23.2)	11.2 (52.2)
Mean daily minimum °C (°F)	−12.5 (9.5)	−6.8 (19.8)	1.7 (35.1)	9.2 (48.6)	13.9 (57.0)	16.7 (62.1)	18.0 (64.4)	16.8 (62.2)	12.3 (54.1)	4.9 (40.8)	−2.3 (27.9)	−9.1 (15.6)	5.2 (41.4)
Record low °C (°F)	−24.5 (−12.1)	−24.7 (−12.5)	−9.5 (14.9)	−1.0 (30.2)	4.8 (40.6)	10.3 (50.5)	11.5 (52.7)	9.6 (49.3)	3.9 (39.0)	−3.4 (25.9)	−10.1 (13.8)	−22.5 (−8.5)	−24.7 (−12.5)
Average precipitation mm (inches)	1.8 (0.07)	3.2 (0.13)	4.0 (0.16)	5.4 (0.21)	9.6 (0.38)	19.6 (0.77)	15.7 (0.62)	15.9 (0.63)	12.6 (0.50)	4.4 (0.17)	2.5 (0.10)	3.4 (0.13)	98.1 (3.87)
Average precipitation days (≥ 0.1 mm)	2.9	2.4	1.4	1.9	3.8	6.6	6.3	7.0	4.2	1.4	1.2	2.9	42
Average snowy days	5.7	3.6	0.8	0.1	0	0	0	0	0	0	1.4	5.8	17.4
Average relative humidity (%)	68	59	44	37	41	48	52	56	57	57	64	72	55
Mean monthly sunshine hours	177.1	182.3	199.7	224.8	264.7	281.5	300.5	278.1	250.0	246.4	192.4	158.1	2,755.6
Percentage possible sunshine	59	60	53	56	59	62	66	66	68	73	66	56	62
Source: China Meteorological Administrationall-time September highall-time October record

== Economy ==
Agricultural products include rice, wheat, corn, cotton and fruit products. Sheep wool and sheepskins are produced in abundance. Industries produce food, spun cotton, building materials and coal.

As of 1885, there was about 139,200 acres (919,475 mu) of cultivated land in Onsu.

== Demographics ==
Historical population
Year	Pop.	±% p.a.
2000	219,219	—
2010	233,933	+0.65%

As of 2015, 197,360 of the 259,305 residents of the county were Uyghur, 55,335 were Han Chinese and 6,610 were from other ethnic groups.

According to the 2002 census, it has a population of 210,000.

As of 1999, 76.17% of the population of Wensu County was Uyghur and 21.43% of the population was Han Chinese.

== Transportation ==
- China National Highway 314

== Historical maps ==
Historical English-language maps including Onsu:

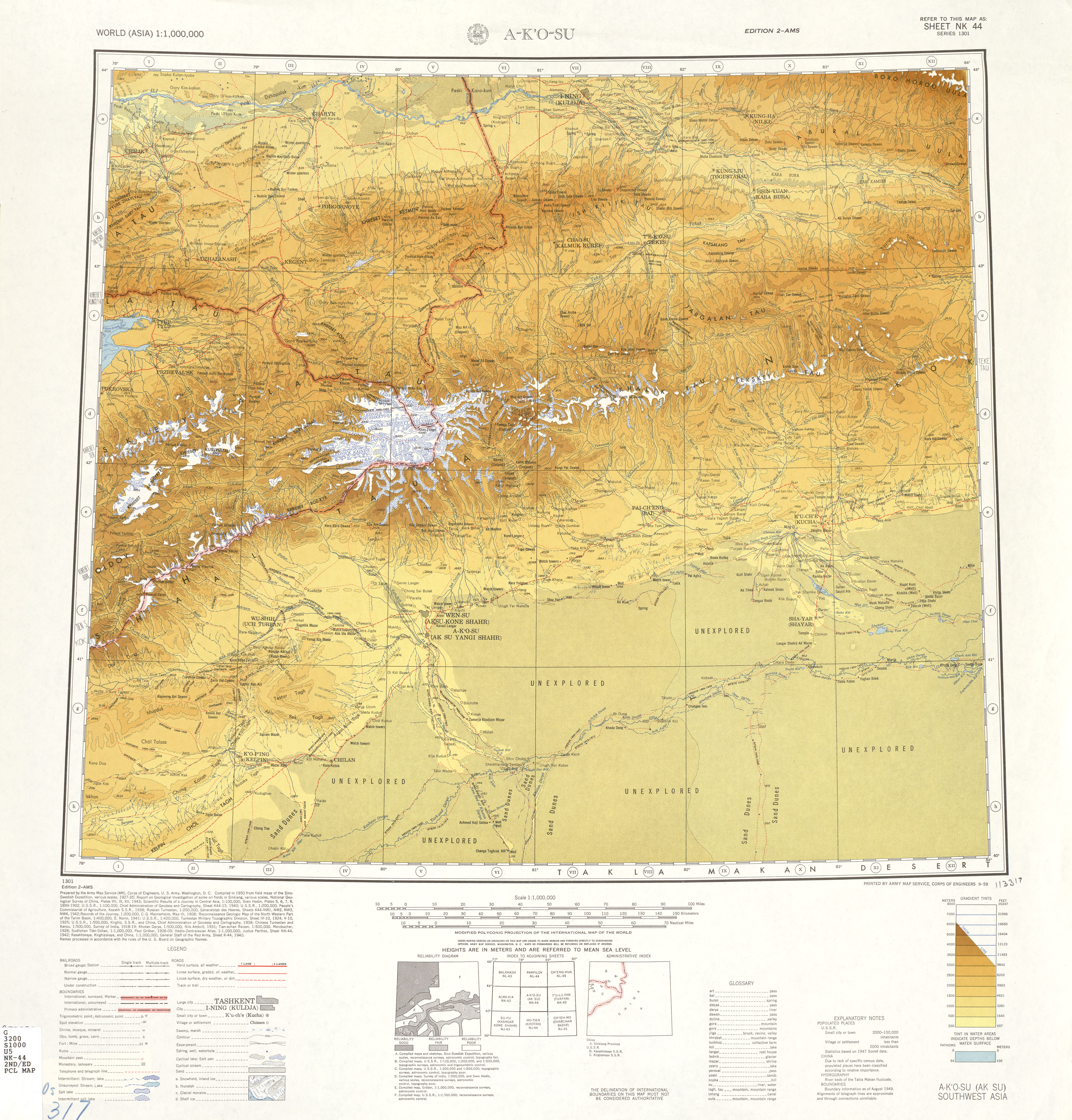
Map including Uqturpan (labeled as WEN-SU (AKSU-KONE SHAHR)) and surrounding region from the International Map of the World (AMS, 1950) (Note: From map: "THE DELINEATION OF INTERNATIONAL BOUNDARIES ON THIS MAP MUST NOT BE CONSIDERED AUTHORITATIVE")

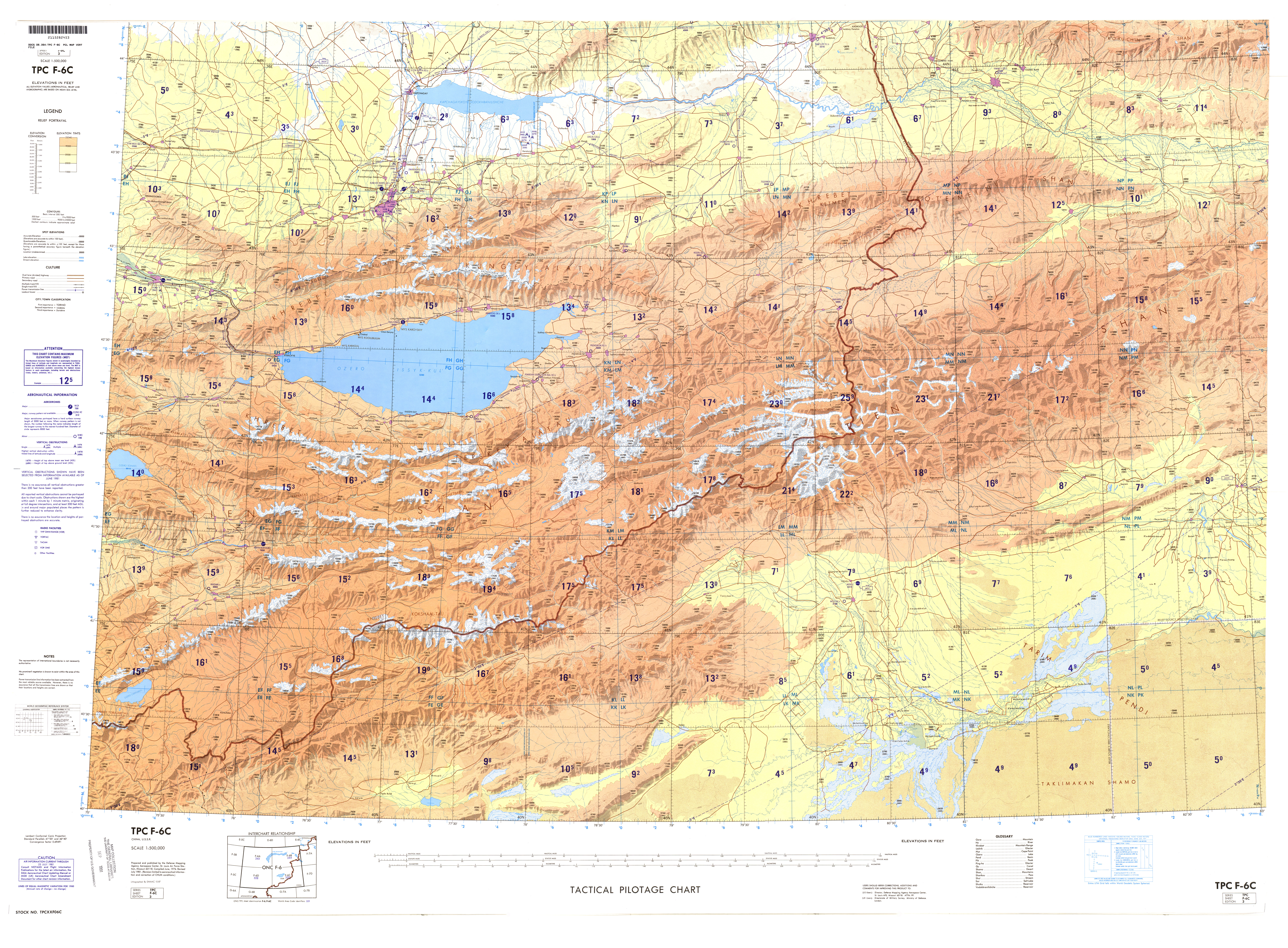
Map including Onsu (labeled as WENSU) (DMA, 1981)

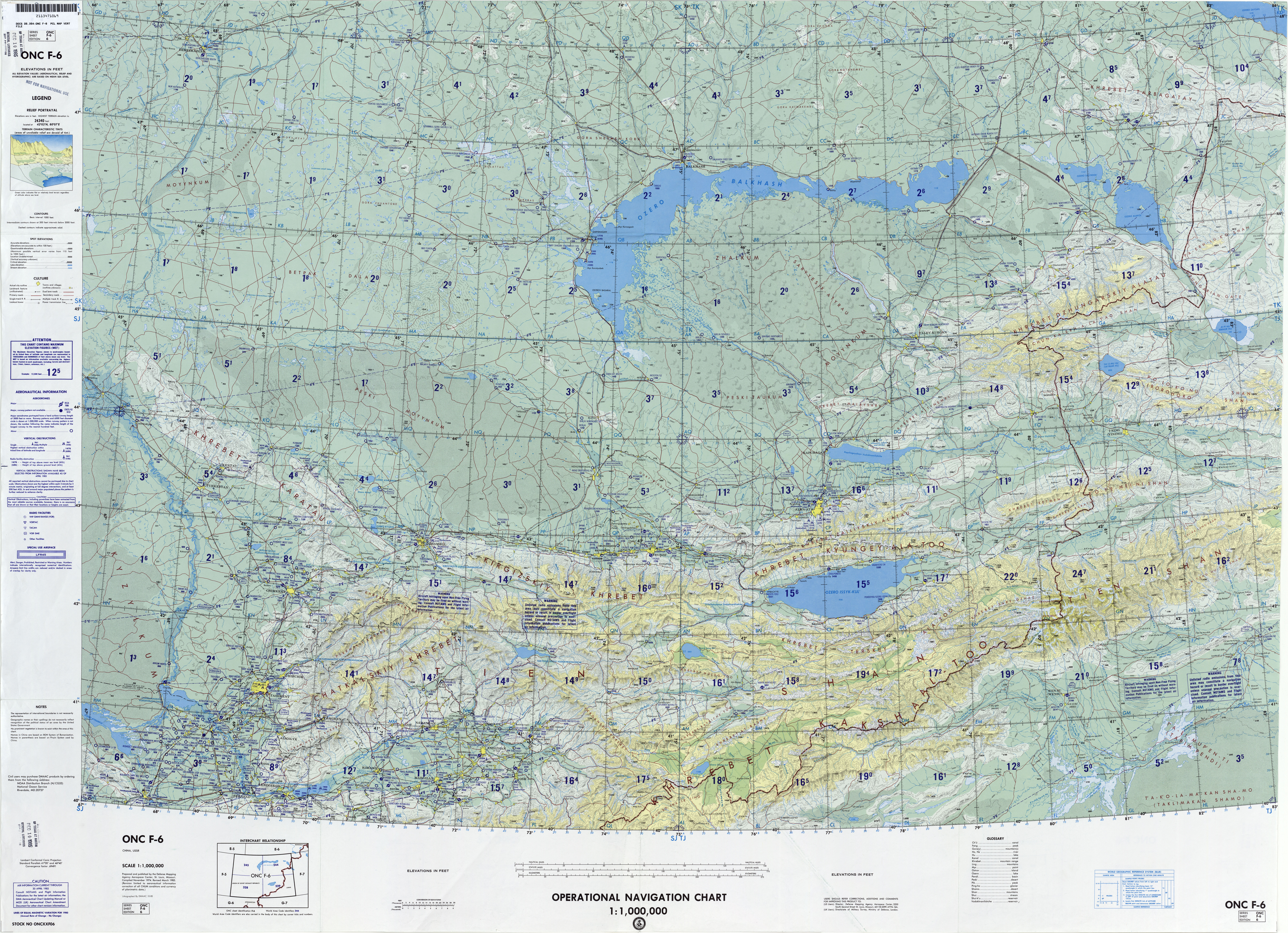
From the Operational Navigation Chart; map including Onsu (labeled as WEN-SU (WENSU)) (DMA, 1985) (Note: From map: "The representation of international boundaries is not necessarily authoritative.")
