= Reichenbachiellaceae =

Scientific classification
- Domain: Bacteria
- Kingdom: Pseudomonadati
- Phylum: Bacteroidota
- Class: Cytophagia
- Order: Cytophagales
- Family: Reichenbachiellaceae; García-López et al. 2020

Genera
- Ekhidna Alain et al. 2010; Marinoscillum Seo et al. 2009; Reichenbachiella Nedashkovskaya et al. 2005

Family of bacteria

Reichenbachiellaceae is a family of gram-negative bacteria in the phylum Bacteroidota.
