= Cesiribacteraceae =

Scientific classification
- Domain: Bacteria
- Kingdom: Pseudomonadati
- Phylum: Bacteroidota
- Class: Cytophagia
- Order: Cytophagales
- Family: Cesiribacteraceae; García-López et al. 2020

Genera
- Cesiribacter Srinivas et al. 2011; Nafulsella Zhang et al. 2013

Family of bacteria

Cesiribacteraceae is a family of gram-negative bacteria in the phylum Bacteroidota.
