= Flexibacter =

Scientific classification
- Domain: Bacteria
- Kingdom: Pseudomonadati
- Phylum: Bacteroidota
- Class: Cytophagia
- Order: Cytophagales
- Family: Flexibacteraceae; García-López et al. 2020
- Genus: Flexibacter; Soriano 1945 (Approved Lists 1980)

Species
- "Flexibacter alginoliquefaciens" Katayama et al. 1985; Flexibacter flexilis Soriano 1945 (Approved Lists 1980); "Flexibacter giganteus" Soriano 1945; "Flexibacter topostinus" Suzuki et al. 1990

Genus of bacteria

Flexibacter is a genus of gram-negative bacteria consisting of some seventeen strains (or species), known for their yellow hue.

Etymology: L. part. adj. flexus (from. L. v. flecto), bent, winding; N.L. masc. n. bacter, rod; N.L. masc. n. Flexibacter, intended to mean flexible rod.

== Species ==
- Flexibacter aggregans (Leadbetter, 1974)
- Flexibacter aurantiacus (Lewin, 1969)
- Flexibacter canadensis (Christensen 1980)
- Flexibacter columnaris (Bernardet and Grimont, 1989)
- Flexibacter elegans (Reichenbach, 1989)
- Flexibacter filiformis (Reichenbach, 1989)
- Flexibacter flexilis (Soriano, 1945)
- Flexibacter japonensis (Fujita et al., 1997)
- Flexibacter ovolyticus (Hansen et al., 1992)
- Flexibacter polymorphus (Lewin, 1974)
- Flexibacter psychrophilus (Bernadet and Grimont, 1989)
- Flexibacter roseolus (Lewin, 1969)
- Flexibacter ruber (Lewin, 1969)
- Flexibacter sancti (Lewin, 1969)
- Flexibacter tractuosus (Leadbetter, 1974)
