= Hymenobacteraceae =

Scientific classification
- Domain: Bacteria
- Kingdom: Pseudomonadati
- Phylum: Bacteroidota
- Class: Cytophagia
- Order: Cytophagales
- Family: Hymenobacteraceae; Munoz et al. 2016

Genera
- Adhaeribacter Rickard et al. 2005; Botryobacter Han et al. 2019; Hymenobacter Hirsch et al. 1999; Nibribacter Kang et al. 2013; "Parahymenobacter" Reddy 2013; Pontibacter Nedashkovskaya et al. 2005; Rufibacter Abaydulla et al. 2014; "Solirubrum" Cuebas-Irizarry et al. 2016

Family of bacteria

Hymenobacteraceae is a family of gram-negative bacteria in the phylum Bacteroidota.
