= Cytophagales =

Scientific classification
- Domain: Bacteria
- Kingdom: Pseudomonadati
- Phylum: Bacteroidota
- Class: Cytophagia; Nakagawa 2012
- Order: Cytophagales; Leadbetter 1974 (Approved Lists 1980)

Families
- "Amoebophilaceae"; Bernardetiaceae; Catalinimonadaceae; Cesiribacteraceae; Cyclobacteriaceae; Cytophagaceae; Flammeovirgaceae; Flexibacteraceae; Fulvivirgaceae; Hymenobacteraceae; Mangrovivirgaceae; Marivirgaceae; Microscillaceae; Mooreiaceae; Persicobacteraceae; Raineyaceae; Reichenbachiellaceae; Rhodocytophagaceae; Roseivirgaceae; Shiellaceae; Spirosomataceae; Splendidivirgaceae; Thermoflexibacteraceae; Thermonemataceae

Synonyms
- Cyclobacteriales Perfiliev & Gabe 1961

Class of bacteria

Cytophagales is an order of non-spore forming, rod-shaped, Gram-negative bacteria that move through a gliding or flexing motion. These chemoorganotrophs are important remineralizers of organic materials into micronutrients. They are widely dispersed in the environment, found in ecosystems including soil, freshwater, seawater and sea ice. Cytophagales is included in the Bacteroidota phylum.

== Name etymology ==
The name Cytophagales means 'cell eater', referring to the degradation of cellulose cell walls. 'Cytos' comes from the Ancient Greek noun κῠ́τος (kútos), which refers to a vessel, and a cell in biology. 'Phagien' comes from the Ancient Greek verb φαγεῖν (phageîn), which translates to "to eat".

== Biology and biochemistry ==
=== General characteristics and biology ===
Bacteria in Cytophagales are all Gram-negative and non-spore forming. They are non-flagellated, but move by exhibiting a gliding or flexing motion. Cytophagales are all unicellular, with rod-shaped cells that can differ significantly in shape. Cells can be short or long, delicate or stout, and have tapering or rounded ends. Two genera of bacteria in the Cytophagales exhibit a cyclic shape. Many species are pleomorphic, meaning they can alter their biological function, morphology, or mode of reproduction in response to environmental conditions. All bacteria in the Cytophagales are chemoorganotrophs and many of them are able to degrade complex biomacromolecules such as proteins, chitin, pectin, agar, starch, or cellulose. Organisms in Cytophagales can be anaerobic, microaerophilic, capnophilic (CO_{2}-requiring), or facultatively anaerobic. They can be highly abundant and are ubiquitous, and likely play a major role in the turnover of matter in the oceans and on land. Cytophagales form colonies that are highly coloured - often in shades of red, orange, and yellow. In response to a 10% KOH solution, yellow and orange Cytophagales colonies are found to immediately change color to red, purple, or brown; this colour change is possibly due to flexirubin-type pigments. These flexirubin-type pigments have been found only in organisms in the CFB group, so far.

=== Biochemistry ===
==== Biopolymer degradation ====
Members of the order Cytophagales are organotrophs, producing hydrolytic enzymes that degrade various biopolymers such as chitin, pectin, starch, agar, and cellulose. Few specific species have been identified, but the select few tend to dominate polysaccharide degradation. These biopolymers make up the high molecular mass dissolved organic matter (HMW, DOM), which is in relatively high concentrations in the ocean. DOM uptake is the primary step in the microbial loop, which controls most of the DOM turnover from primary production, supporting vast quantities of oceanic heterotrophic bacteria. Cytophagales species likely play a large role in turnover of organic carbon in nature, as they are found in high quantities in oceanic, freshwater, soil, and even sea-ice environments. This is of considerable scientific interest, with importance in carbohydrate enzymology, oceanography, and microbial studies.

Members of the Cytophaga-Flavobacteria phylogenetic group are found in high quantities degrading chitin and protein, but are underrepresented compared to various other phylogenetic clusters of bacteria in the degradation of amino acids. In glacial stream water that had been supplemented in allochthonous organic material, Cytophaga-Flavobacteria populations increased six- to eight-fold.

===== Cellulose degradation =====
Aerobic cellulose degrading Cytophaga bacteria have been identified on fishing nets made from cotton or hemp used by Japanese fishermen. The cellulose degradation process is hydrolytic, either through a weathering or liquid-type breakdown mechanism.

Cytophaga hutchinsonii is a well-characterized soil bacteria in the order Cytophagales that degrades crystalline cellulose. Cells of C. hutchinsonii are of interest, as their cellulose degradation is not inhibited by glucose. Furthermore, the mechanism of cellulose degradation is novel, as C. hutchinsonii does not encode any cellobiohydrolases, only β-glucosidases, periplasmic endoglucanases, and secreted endoglucanases.

==== Alkaloid production ====
Marine bacterial species Catalinamonas alkaloidigena and Mooreia alkaloidigena produce quinoline alkaloids. Colonies of these species appear orange-pink in colour, but do not produce flexirubin-type pigment. Bacteria in the species M. alkaloidigena were first isolated from a marine sediment sample taken off the coast of Palmyra Atoll, the northernmost of the Line islands in the Pacific Ocean, while C. alkaloidigena was isolated from marine sediments collected from 8-m deep off of Catalina Islands in California, USA. Casein, agar, starch, and chitin hydrolysis have been observed.

These species represent novel families in the order Cytophagales. Alkaloid production is of considerable interest for drug development.

==== Polycyclic sulfide production ====
Marine Cytophaga bacterial isolates from the North Sea have been extracted and reveal novel polycyclic volatile sulfides. Polycyclic sulfides have a characteristic smell of diesel fuel.

Several compounds have been identified. An example is tetrathiocane which adopts a twisted chair conformation.

==== Radiation resistance ====
Some bacteria in the order Cytophagales are found to be radiation resistant. Rhodocytophaga rosea and Nibribacter ruber are bacteria species first isolated from a soil environment in Korea. They contain novel radiation resistance genes. DNA excision repair pathways were present, including the RecA repair protein. The strains show survival rates of 71% and 4% after UV exposure of 300J/m^2, compared to the 0% rate of survival for E. coli species.

==== Flexirubin in Cytophagales ====
Flexirubin was initially isolated as a new pigment from Flexibacter elegans by Reinbach et al. in 1974. It has been found in many other bacteria within Flavobacteriales and Cytophagales. (While flexirubin is thought to be unique to the CFB group, organisms in this group contain other carotenoid pigments in addition to flexirubin.) Flexirubin is a non-carotenoid structure and can be easily recognized by its characteristic mass spectrometric fragmentation pattern. Each genera of bacteria produce specifically modified species of flexirubin, which are useful as chemosystematic markers. The production of flexirubin-type pigments is correlated with cell growth- resting cells do not produce these pigments. The function of flexirubin was studied by Xinfeng et al. (2017), who isolated the fabZ gene in Cytophaga hutchinsonii. FabZ is an essential gene for flexirubin pigment synthesis. The FabZ mutant that failed to produce flexirubin was more sensitive to UV radiation, oxidative stress, and alkaline stress than the wild type. Flexirubin has conjugated double bonds that absorb light and hydroxyphenyl in the chromophore, which give the bacteria their characteristic colour- yellow under neutral pH and red under alkaline conditions. Flexirubin-type pigments have even been used traditionally as a bioproduct; they are an eco-friendly natural colorant. Flexirubin-type pigments are also currently being assessed by the scientific community for their potential for therapeutic uses and applicability in the food and textile industry.

== Ecology ==
Bacteria in the order Cytophagales can differ in their ecological roles as a response to the various environments in which they can be found. In terrestrial systems, they can be found in neutral or near-neutral pH soils, humus, and animal feces. In aquatic systems they are commonly present in near-shore freshwater bodies, estuaries, aerobic sediments, and dense algal mats.

Members of the Cytophagales are also known to be found in large abundance in the ice and coastal pelagic waters of Antarctica, contributing up to 70% of bacterial biomass. As a result, the order plays a key role in the remineralization of organic materials into micronutrients. This cycling process allows the transfer and use of biologically important nutrients across different trophic levels found within the aquatic system.

Bacteria in the Order Cytophagales possess cellulose-degrading qualities and have been known to often associate with several non-cellulolytic microbes. For example, a synergistic relationship between some members of the Cytophagales, and some strains in the genus Achromobacter, results in enhanced cellulolytic activity in some isolates of the Cytophagales. For example, bacteria in the genus Achromobacter contribute to the relationship through the production of β-glucosidase which can be used by Cytophagales microbes to hydrolyze cellodextrin into glucose and prevent the feedback inhibition that would otherwise occur with the accumulation of cellobiose.

=== Environment and abundance ===
Prokaryote biomass in the oceans is clustered in the surface waters and is dominated by autotrophic and heterotrophic bacteria. Among the heterotrophic bacteria, the two most abundant groups are the Proteobacteria and the Cytophaga-Flavobacteria cluster. Heterotrophic bacteria are crucial in the cycling of dissolved organic matter (DOM) in the ocean, which affects the global carbon budget.

Fluorescence in-situ hybridization (FISH) has been used to estimate abundance of Cytophaga-Flavobacteria. The most common oligonucleotide probe for Cytophaga-Flavobacteria is CF319a. However, CF319a does not recognize some Cytophaga-Flavobacteria, so current abundance values are likely to be underestimated.

Cytophaga-Flavobacteria is the most abundant of all bacterial groups in ocean habitats and accounts for about half of bacteria identified by FISH. They are also abundant in freshwater and sediment systems. However, clone library abundance estimates from 16S rRNA genes from free-living bacterial assemblages show different results. Several studies have been done to compare clone libraries and FISH abundance estimates at the same location in the oceans. The results of these studies show that FISH abundance estimates are much higher than clone library estimates - leading some scientists to believe that the Cytophaga-Flavobacteria cluster is under-represented in clone libraries while other bacterial groups are overrepresented.

A study done by Jurgens et al. examined the growth rates of several bacterial groups using FISH. They found that the net growth rate of Cytophaga-Flavobacteria was about double the rate of other bacterial groups examined. This could account for the high abundance of Cytophaga-Flavobacteria in the oceans.

== Taxonomy and phylogeny ==
Cytophagales was first described by Leadbetter in 1974, who is the authority for the order. Its approximate phylogenetic position was determined in 1985 through 16s rRNA studies, but other experiments have shown that Cytophagales' exact taxonomy is still currently hard to pinpoint. The genera Bernardetia, Hugenholtzia, Garritya, and Eisenibacter are on separate branches within the Cytophagales based on methods such as 16S rRNA sequencing and phylogenomic analysis, as well as physiological and morphological data. Other relatives include Thermoflexibacter, which is a genus that 'represents a branch of uncertain affiliation' within the Cytophagales order. Known families belonging to the order Cytophagales include Microscillaceae and Bernardetiaceae, as well as Catalinimonadaceae and Cesiribacteraceae, among many others. Genera in the Cytophagales comprise Cytophaga, Flexibacter, Sporocytophaga, Sphaero-cytophagal, Capnocytophaga, Microscilla, and Lysobacter, as well as others included in the taxonomic list below.

=== Taxonomic history ===
The taxonomy of Cytophagales presents a considerable challenge and has been revisited and modified many times over the past 100 years. Most recently the International Committee on Systematics of Prokaryotes: Subcommittee on the Taxonomy of Aerobic Bacteroidetes met to discuss taxonomic changes in 2017. Additionally, García-López et al. (2019) published a paper which defined the families in Cytophagales, which have been reflected on LSPN.

=== Phylogeny ===
The currently accepted taxonomy is based on the List of Prokaryotic names with Standing in Nomenclature

Whole-genome based phylogeny (Note: Catalinimonadaceae, Persicobacteraceae, and Raineyaceae are not included in this phylogenetic tree.)

- - - - Hymenobacteraceae
      - - Mooreiaceae
        - Flexibacteraceae
    - - Cytophagaceae
      - Spirosomataceae
  - - - Thermonemataceae
      - Microscillaceae
    - - - - Thermoflexibacteraceae
          - Bernardetiaceae
        - Flammeovirgaceae
      - - - Cesiribacteraceae
          - Fulvivirgaceae
        - - - Reichenbachiellaceae
            - Roseivirgaceae
          - - Marivirgaceae
            - Cyclobacteriaceae

16S rRNA based LTP_08_2023

- - Raineyaceae Albuquerque et al. 2018
  - - Microscillaceae Hahnke et al. 2017
    - - Cytophagales
        - Hymenobacteraceae Munoz et al. 2016
        - - - - Xanthovirga
              - Persicobacteraceae Munoz et al. 2016
            - - Eisenibacter
              - - Luteivirga
                - Flammeovirgaceae Yoon et al. 2011 (incl. Bernardetiaceae)
          - - - - Mooreiaceae Choi et al. 2013
                - Thermonemataceae Munoz et al. 2016
              - Cyclobacteriaceae Nedashkovskaya and Ludwig 2012
            - - - "Marinoscillaceae"
                - - Marivirgaceae García-López et al. 2020
                  - - - Mangrovivirgaceae Sefrji et al. 2021
                      - Catalinimonadaceae Choi et al. 2013
                    - - - Fulvivirgaceae García-López et al. 2020
                        - Reichenbachiellaceae García-López et al. 2020
                      - Roseivirgaceae García-López et al. 2020
              - - Cesiribacteraceae García-López et al. 2020
                - - Fulvivirgaceae 2
                  - - - Cytophagaceae Stanier 1940
                      - - Flexibacteraceae García-López et al. 2020
                        - Thermoflexibacteraceae García-López et al. 2020
                    - - "Rhodocytophagaceae" Pallen, Rodriguez-R & Alikhan 2022 ex Zhang et al. 2023
                      - Spirosomaceae (sic) Larkin and Borrall 1978
      - - Chitinophagales
        - - Sphingobacteriales
          - - Bacteroidales
            - Flavobacteriales

120 marker proteins based GTDB 08-RS214

- - "Amoebophilaceae" Santos-Garcia et al. 2014
  - - Cyclobacteriaceae (incl. Cesiribacteraceae; Fulvivirgaceae; Mangrovivirgaceae; Marinoscillaceae; Marivirgaceae; Persicobacteraceae; Reichenbachiellaceae; Roseivirgaceae)
    - - Cytophagaceae
      - - - - Microscillaceae
            - Thermonemataceae (incl. Mooreiaceae; Raineyaceae)
          - - Thermoflexibacteraceae
            - - Bernardetiaceae Hahnke et al. 2017
              - Flammeovirgaceae
        - - - "Rhodocytophagaceae"
            - Spirosomataceae
          - - Catalinimonadaceae (incl. Flexibacteraceae)
            - Hymenobacteraceae
