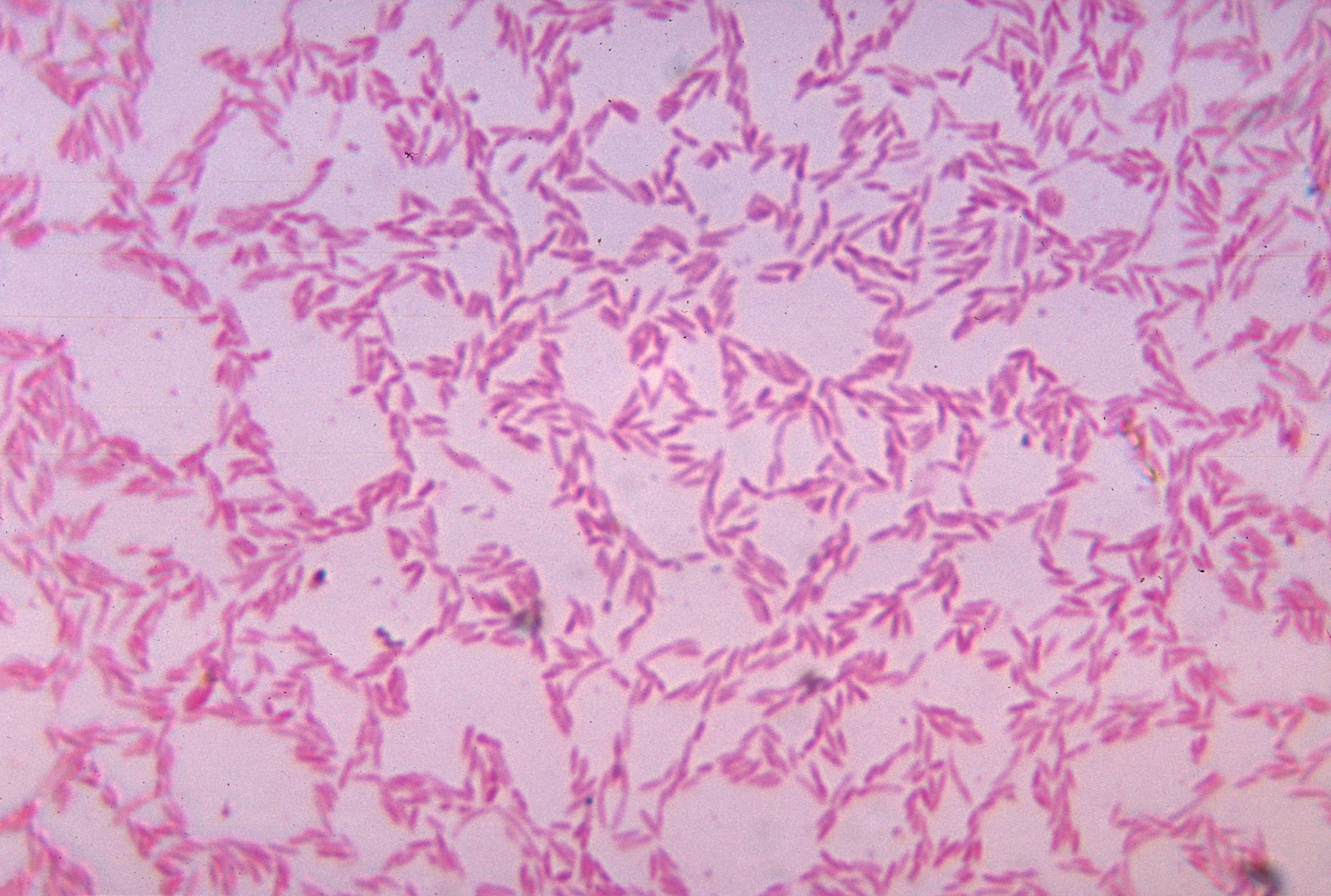
- Bacteroides biacutis

Scientific classification
- Domain: Bacteria
- Kingdom: Pseudomonadati
- Phylum: Bacteroidota; Krieg et al. 2021

Classes
- Bacteroidia Krieg 2012; Chitinophagia Munoz et al. 2017; Cytophagia Nakagawa 2012; Flavobacteriia Bernardet 2012; Saprospiria Hahnke et al. 2018; Sphingobacteriia Kämpfer 2012

Synonyms
- "Bacteroidaeota" Oren et al. 2015; "Bacteroidetes" Krieg et al. 2010; "Bacteroidota" Whitman et al. 2018; "Saprospirae" Margulis and Schwartz 1998; "Sphingobacteria" Cavalier-Smith 2002

= Bacteroidota =

Phylum of Gram-negative bacteria

The phylum Bacteroidota (synonym Bacteroidetes) is composed of three large classes of Gram-negative, nonsporeforming, anaerobic or aerobic, and rod-shaped bacteria that are widely distributed in the environment, including in soil, sediments, and sea water, as well as in the guts and on the skin of animals.

Although some Bacteroides spp. can be opportunistic pathogens, many Bacteroidota are symbiotic species highly adjusted to the gastrointestinal tract. Bacteroides are highly abundant in intestines, reaching up to 10^{11} cells g^{−1} of intestinal material. They perform metabolic conversions that are essential for the host, such as degradation of proteins or complex sugar polymers. Bacteroidota colonize the gastrointestinal tract already in infants, as non-digestible oligosaccharides in mother milk support the growth of both Bacteroides and Bifidobacterium spp. Bacteroides spp. are selectively recognized by the immune system of the host through specific interactions.

== History ==
Bacteroides fragilis was the first Bacteroides species isolated in 1898 as a human pathogen linked to appendicitis among other clinical cases. By far, the species in the class Bacteroidia are the most well-studied, including the genus Bacteroides (an abundant organism in the feces of warm-blooded animals including humans), and Porphyromonas, a group of organisms inhabiting the human oral cavity. The class Bacteroidia was formerly called Bacteroidetes; as it was until recently the only class in the phylum, the name was changed in the fourth volume of Bergey's Manual of Systematic Bacteriology.

For a long time, it was thought that the majority of Gram-negative gastrointestinal tract bacteria belonged to the genus Bacteroides, but in recent years many species of Bacteroides have undergone reclassification. Based on current classification, the majority of the gastrointestinal Bacteroidota species belong to the families Bacteroidaceae, Prevotellaceae, Rikenellaceae, and Porphyromonadaceae. This phylum is sometimes grouped with Chlorobiota, Fibrobacterota, Gemmatimonadota, Calditrichota, and marine group A to form the FCB group or superphylum. In the alternative classification system proposed by Cavalier-Smith, this taxon is instead a class in the phylum Sphingobacteria.

== Medical and ecological role ==
In the gastrointestinal microbiota Bacteroidota have a very broad metabolic potential and are regarded as one of the most stable part of gastrointestinal microflora. Reduced abundance of the Bacteroidota in some cases is associated with obesity. This bacterial group as a whole has conflicting evidence for alteration of abundance in patients with irritable bowel syndrome, though its genus Bacteroides is likely enriched, but it may be involved in type 1 and type 2 diabetes pathogenesis. Bacteroides spp. in contrast to Prevotella spp. were recently found to be enriched in the metagenomes of subjects with low gene richness that were associated with adiposity, insulin resistance and dyslipidaemia as well as an inflammatory phenotype. Bacteroidota species that belong to classes Flavobacteriales and Sphingobacteriales are typical soil bacteria and are only occasionally detected in the gastrointestinal tract, except Capnocytophaga spp. and Sphingobacterium spp. that can be detected in the human oral cavity.

Bacteroidota are not limited to gut microbiota, they colonize a variety of habitats on Earth. For example, Bacteroidota, together with "Pseudomonadota", "Bacillota", and "Actinomycetota", are also among the most abundant bacterial groups in rhizosphere. They have been detected in soil samples from various locations, including cultivated fields, greenhouse soils and unexploited areas. Bacteroidota also inhabit freshwater lakes, rivers, as well as oceans. They are increasingly recognized as an important compartment of the bacterioplankton in marine environments, especially in pelagic oceans. Halophilic Bacteroidota genus Salinibacter inhabit hypersaline environments such as salt-saturated brines in hypersaline lakes. Salinibacter shares many properties with halophilic Archaea such as Halobacterium and Haloquadratum that inhabit the same environments. Phenotypically, Salinibacter is remarkably similar to Halobacterium and therefore for a long time remained unidentified.

== Metabolism ==
Gastrointestinal Bacteroidota species produce succinic acid, acetic acid, and in some cases propionic acid, as the major end-products. Species belonging to the genera Alistipes, Bacteroides, Parabacteroides, Prevotella, Paraprevotella, Alloprevotella, Barnesiella, and Tannerella are saccharolytic, while species belonging to Odoribacter and Porphyromonas are predominantly asaccharolytic. Some Bacteroides spp. and Prevotella spp. can degrade complex plant polysaccharides such as starch, cellulose, xylans, and pectins. The Bacteroidota species also play an important role in protein metabolism by proteolytic activity assigned to the proteases linked to the cell. Some "Bacteroides spp. have a potential to utilize urea as a nitrogen source. Other important functions of Bacteroides spp. include the deconjugation of bile acids and growth on mucus. Many members of the Bacteroidota genera (Flexibacter, Cytophaga, Sporocytophaga and relatives) are coloured yellow-orange to pink-red due to the presence of pigments of the flexirubin group. In some Bacteroidota strains, flexirubins may be present together with carotenoid pigments. Carotenoid pigments are usually found in marine and halophilic members of the group, whereas flexirubin pigments are more frequent in clinical, freshwater or soil-colonizing representatives.

== Genomics ==
Comparative genomic analysis has led to the identification of 27 proteins which are present in most species of the phylum Bacteroidota. Of these, one protein is found in all sequenced Bacteroidota species, while two other proteins are found in all sequenced species with the exception of those from the genus Bacteroides. The absence of these two proteins in this genus is likely due to selective gene loss. Additionally, four proteins have been identified which are present in all Bacteroidota species except Cytophaga hutchinsonii; this is again likely due to selective gene loss. A further eight proteins have been identified which are present in all sequenced Bacteroidota genomes except Salinibacter ruber. The absence of these proteins may be due to selective gene loss, or because S. ruber branches very deeply, the genes for these proteins may have evolved after the divergence of S. ruber. A conserved signature indel has also been identified; this three-amino-acid deletion in ClpB chaperone is present in all species of the Bacteroidota phylum except S. ruber. This deletion is also found in one Chlorobiota species and one Archaeum species, which is likely due to horizontal gene transfer. These 27 proteins and the three-amino-acid deletion serve as molecular markers for the Bacteroidota.

=== Relatedness of Bacteroidota, Chlorobiota, and Fibrobacterota phyla ===
Species from the Bacteroidota and Chlorobiota phyla branch very closely together in phylogenetic trees, indicating a close relationship. Through the use of comparative genomic analysis, three proteins have been identified which are uniquely shared by virtually all members of the Bacteroidota and Chlorobiota phyla. The sharing of these three proteins is significant because other than them, no proteins from either the Bacteroidota or Chlorobiota phyla are shared by any other groups of bacteria. Several conserved signature indels have also been identified which are uniquely shared by members of the phyla. The presence of these molecular signatures supports their close relationship. Additionally, the phylum Fibrobacterota is indicated to be specifically related to these two phyla. A clade consisting of these three phyla is strongly supported by phylogenetic analyses based upon a number of different proteins These phyla also branch in the same position based upon conserved signature indels in a number of important proteins. Lastly and most importantly, two conserved signature indels (in the RpoC protein and in serine hydroxymethyltransferase) and one signature protein PG00081 have been identified that are uniquely shared by all of the species from these three phyla. All of these results provide compelling evidence that the species from these three phyla shared a common ancestor exclusive of all other bacteria, and it has been proposed that they should all recognized as part of a single "FCB" superphylum.

== Phylogeny ==
The currently accepted taxonomy is based on the List of Prokaryotic names with Standing in Nomenclature

Whole-genome based phylogeny

- - - Chlorobiota
    - - Balneolota
      - Rhodothermota
  - - Bacteroidota
      - Saprospiria
      - - - - Chitinophagia
            - Sphingobacteriia
          - Cytophagia
        - - Bacteroidia
          - Flavobacteriia

16S rRNA based LTP_08_2023

- - - Ignavibacteriota
      Ignavibacteria
    - Chlorobiota
      Chlorobiia
  - - - Rhodothermota
        Rhodothermia
    - - Balneolota
        Balneolia
      - Bacteroidota
        - Raineyaceae
        - - Microscillaceae
          - - - Cytophagia
                Cytophagales
            - - - Chitinophagia
                  - Saprospirales
                  - Chitinophagales
              - - - Sphingobacteriia
                    Sphingobacteriales
                - - Bacteroidia
                    Bacteroidales
                  - Flavobacteriia
                    Flavobacteriales

120 single copy marker proteins based GTDB 10-RS226

- Bacteroidota_A
  - - - "Kapabacteria"
        "Kapabacteriales"
    - - "Kryptonia"
        "Kryptoniales"
      - "Ignavibacteriia"
        - "Tepidaquicellales" [SJA-28: 100: B-1AR: Ch128a]
        - Ignavibacteriales
  - - Chlorobiia
      Chlorobiales
    - Rhodothermia
      - Balneolales
      - Rhodothermales

- Bacteroidota
  - Bacteroidia
    - - Blattabacteriaceae {Flavobacteriales_B}
      - - "Amoebophilaceae" {Cytophagales_A}
        - Cytophagales
    - - Chitinophagales
      - - Sphingobacteriales
        - - - Aurantibacillaceae {B-17B0}
            - Bacteroidales
          - Flavobacteriales

== See also ==
- List of bacteria genera
- List of bacterial orders
