= Algivirga pacifica =

Scientific classification
- Domain: Bacteria
- Kingdom: Pseudomonadati
- Phylum: Bacteroidota
- Class: Cytophagia
- Order: Cytophagales
- Family: Flammeovirgaceae
- Genus: Algivirga
- Species: A. pacifica

Binomial name
- Algivirga pacifica Kim et al. 2013

Type strain
- JCM 18326, KCCM 90107, S354

Synonyms
- "Algomonas pacifica"

Species of bacterium

"Algivirga pacifica" is a Gram-negative and aerobic bacterium from the genus "Algivirga" which has been isolated from seawater from Micronesia.
