= Sediminitomix flava =

Scientific classification
- Domain: Bacteria
- Kingdom: Pseudomonadati
- Phylum: Bacteroidota
- Class: Cytophagia
- Order: Cytophagales
- Family: Flammeovirgaceae
- Genus: Sediminitomix
- Species: S. flava

Binomial name
- Sediminitomix flava Khan et al. 2007

Type strain
- CIP 109411, KCTC 12970, Mok-1-85, NBRC 101625

Synonyms
- Longitomix flava

Species of bacterium

Sediminitomix flava is a Gram-negative bacterium from the genus of Sediminitomix which has been isolated from marine sediments from the Okinawa Island on Japan.
