= Flammeovirga pacifica =

Scientific classification
- Domain: Bacteria
- Kingdom: Pseudomonadati
- Phylum: Bacteroidota
- Class: Cytophagia
- Order: Cytophagales
- Family: Flammeovirgaceae
- Genus: Flammeovirga
- Species: F. pacifica

Binomial name
- Flammeovirga pacifica Xu et al. 2012

Type strain
- CCTCC AB 2010364, DSM 24597, LMG 26175, MCCC 1A06425, WPAGA1

Synonyms
- Flammeovirga wpagaensis

Species of bacterium

Flammeovirga pacifica is a bacterium from the genus Flammeovirga which has been isolated from deep sea sediments from the West Pacific Ocean.
