= Flammeovirga kamogawensis =

Scientific classification
- Domain: Bacteria
- Kingdom: Pseudomonadati
- Phylum: Bacteroidota
- Class: Cytophagia
- Order: Cytophagales
- Family: Flammeovirgaceae
- Genus: Flammeovirga
- Species: F. kamogawensis

Binomial name
- Flammeovirga kamogawensis Hosoya and Yokota 2007

Type strain
- IAM 15451, JCM 23196, NCIMB 14281, YS10

Synonyms
- Flammeovirga bosoensis

Species of bacterium

Flammeovirga kamogawensis is a bacterium from the genus Flammeovirga which has been isolated from coastal seawater from Kamogawa in Japan.
