= Rapidithrix thailandica =

Scientific classification
- Domain: Bacteria
- Kingdom: Pseudomonadati
- Phylum: Bacteroidota
- Class: Cytophagia
- Order: Cytophagales
- Family: Flammeovirgaceae
- Genus: Rapidithrix
- Species: R. thailandica

Binomial name
- Rapidithrix thailandica Srisukchayakul et al. 2007

Type strain
- IAM 15448, JCM 23209, TISTR 1750

Synonyms
- Rapidiothrix thailandica

Species of bacterium

Rapidithrix thailandica is a bacterium from the genus of Rapidithrix which has been isolated from the coastline from the Andaman Sea in Thailand. Rapidithrix thailandica produces an antibacterial amino phenyl pyrrolidone.
