= Flammeovirga arenaria =

Scientific classification
- Domain: Bacteria
- Kingdom: Pseudomonadati
- Phylum: Bacteroidota
- Class: Cytophagia
- Order: Cytophagales
- Family: Flammeovirgaceae
- Genus: Flammeovirga
- Species: F. arenaria

Binomial name
- Flammeovirga arenaria (ex Lewin 1969) Takahashi et al. 2006

Type strain
- CIP 109101, IFO 15982, JCM 21777, NBRC 15982

Synonyms
- Microscilla arenaria

Species of bacterium

Flammeovirga arenaria is a gram-negative bacterium from the genus Flammeovirga which has been isolated from marine sand in Mexico.
