= Flammeovirga yaeyamensis =

Scientific classification
- Domain: Bacteria
- Kingdom: Pseudomonadati
- Phylum: Bacteroidota
- Class: Cytophagia
- Order: Cytophagales
- Family: Flammeovirgaceae
- Genus: Flammeovirga
- Species: F. yaeyamensis

Binomial name
- Flammeovirga yaeyamensis Takahashi et al. 2006

Type strain
- CIP 109099, NBRC 100898, NBRC 100899, NBRC 100900, NBRC 100901, NBRC 100902, MY04, IR25-3

Species of bacterium

Flammeovirga yaeyamensis is a bacterium from the genus Flammeovirga which has been isolated from the seaweed Digenea simplex from the Yaeyama Islands on Japan.
