= Flammeovirga aprica =

Scientific classification
- Domain: Bacteria
- Kingdom: Pseudomonadati
- Phylum: Bacteroidota
- Class: Cytophagia
- Order: Cytophagales
- Family: Flammeovirgaceae
- Genus: Flammeovirga
- Species: F. aprica

Binomial name
- Flammeovirga aprica (Reichenbach 1989) Nakagawa et al. 1997

Type strain
- ATCC 23126, CIP 104807, IAM 14298, IFO 15941, JCM 21138, JI-4, LMG 8370, NBRC 15941, NCIMB 13348, NRRL B-14729

Synonyms Cytophaga aprica
- Cytophaga diffluens subsp. aprica

Species of bacterium

Flammeovirga aprica is a gram-negative bacterium from the genus Flammeovirga which has been isolated from marine mud in Yugoslavia.
