= Tunicatimonas pelagia =

Scientific classification
- Domain: Bacteria
- Kingdom: Pseudomonadati
- Phylum: Bacteroidota
- Class: Cytophagia
- Order: Cytophagales
- Family: Flammeovirgaceae
- Genus: Tunicatimonas
- Species: T. pelagia

Binomial name
- Tunicatimonas pelagia Yoon et al. 2015

Type strain
- KCTC 23473, NBRC 107804, N5DB8-4

Species of bacterium

Tunicatimonas pelagia is a Gram-negative, strictly aerobic, rod-shaped and non-motile bacterium from the genus Tunicatimonas which has been isolated from a sea anemone.
