= Flammeovirga pectinis =

Scientific classification
- Domain: Bacteria
- Kingdom: Pseudomonadati
- Phylum: Bacteroidota
- Class: Cytophagia
- Order: Cytophagales
- Family: Flammeovirgaceae
- Genus: Flammeovirga
- Species: F. pectinis

Binomial name
- Flammeovirga pectinis Jeong et al. 2020

Type strain
- L12M1

Species of bacterium

Flammeovirga pectinis is a Gram-negative, aerobic, rod-shaped and motile bacterium from the genus Flammeovirga which has been isolated from the gut of the scallop Patinopecten yessoensis.
