= Flexithrix =

Scientific classification
- Domain: Bacteria
- Kingdom: Pseudomonadati
- Phylum: Bacteroidota
- Class: Cytophagia
- Order: Cytophagales
- Family: Flammeovirgaceae
- Genus: Flexithrix; Lewin 1970 (Approved Lists 1980)
- Species: F. dorotheae

Binomial name
- Flexithrix dorotheae Lewin 1970 (Approved Lists 1980)

Genus of bacteria

Flexithrix is a Gram-negative, non-spore-forming and motile genus of bacteria from the family Flammeovirgaceae with one known species (Flexithrix dorotheae) which first has been isolated from marine mud. Flammeovirga produce zeaxanthin, poly-β-D-glutamic acid and poly-β-L-glutamine.
