= Limibacter armeniacum =

Scientific classification
- Domain: Bacteria
- Kingdom: Pseudomonadati
- Phylum: Bacteroidota
- Class: Cytophagia
- Order: Cytophagales
- Family: Flammeovirgaceae
- Genus: Limibacter
- Species: L. armeniacum

Binomial name
- Limibacter armeniacum Yoon et al. 2008

Type strain
- DSM 26026, YM11-159, YM11-185, KCTC 22132, MBIC 08286

Species of bacterium

Limibacter armeniacum is a Gram-negative, strictly aerobic and rod-shaped bacterium from the genus Limibacter which has been isolated from marine sediments from the Carp Island from Palau.
