= Flammeovirga agarivorans =

Scientific classification
- Domain: Bacteria
- Kingdom: Pseudomonadati
- Phylum: Bacteroidota
- Class: Cytophagia
- Order: Cytophagales
- Family: Flammeovirgaceae
- Genus: Flammeovirga
- Species: F. agarivorans

Binomial name
- Flammeovirga agarivorans Wang et al. 2020

Type strain
- SR4

Species of bacterium

Flammeovirga agarivorans is a Gram-negative, aerobic and motile bacterium from the genus Flammeovirga which has been isolated from seawater from the Luhuitou fringing reef in China.

== Description ==
Colonies are reddish-orange and smooth on marine agar. The species has an optimum growth temperature of 28 °C. The optimum salinity is 2-4% and optimum pH is 7.0. F. agarivorans is catalase and oxidase positive.
