= Imperialibacter roseus =

Scientific classification
- Domain: Bacteria
- Kingdom: Pseudomonadati
- Phylum: Bacteroidota
- Class: Cytophagia
- Order: Cytophagales
- Family: Flammeovirgaceae
- Genus: Imperialibacter
- Species: I. roseus

Binomial name
- Imperialibacter roseus Wang et al. 2013

Type strain
- CICC 10659, KCTC 32399, P4

Species of bacterium

Imperialibacter roseus is a Gram-negative and aerobic bacterium from the genus Imperialibacter which has been isolated from groundwater.
