= Perexilibacter aurantiacus =

Scientific classification
- Domain: Bacteria
- Kingdom: Pseudomonadati
- Phylum: Bacteroidota
- Class: Cytophagia
- Order: Cytophagales
- Family: Flammeovirgaceae
- Genus: Perexilibacter
- Species: P. aurantiacus

Binomial name
- Perexilibacter aurantiacus Yoon et al. 2007

Type strain
- DSM 26272, IAM 15413, JCM 23194, KCTC 12867, MBIC 06993, Shu-F-UV2-2

Species of bacterium

Perexilibacter aurantiacus is a Gram-negative, strictly aerobic and rod-shaped bacterium from the genus Perexilibacter which has been isolated from sediments from the Carp Island on Palau.
