= Sediminitomix =

Scientific classification
- Domain: Bacteria
- Kingdom: Pseudomonadati
- Phylum: Bacteroidota
- Class: Cytophagia
- Order: Cytophagales
- Family: Flammeovirgaceae
- Genus: Sediminitomix; Khan et al. 2007

Species
- S. flava

Genus of bacteria

Sediminitomix is a genus from the family of Flammeovirgaceae with one known species (Sediminitomix flava).
