= Saffron =

Spice made from crocus flowers

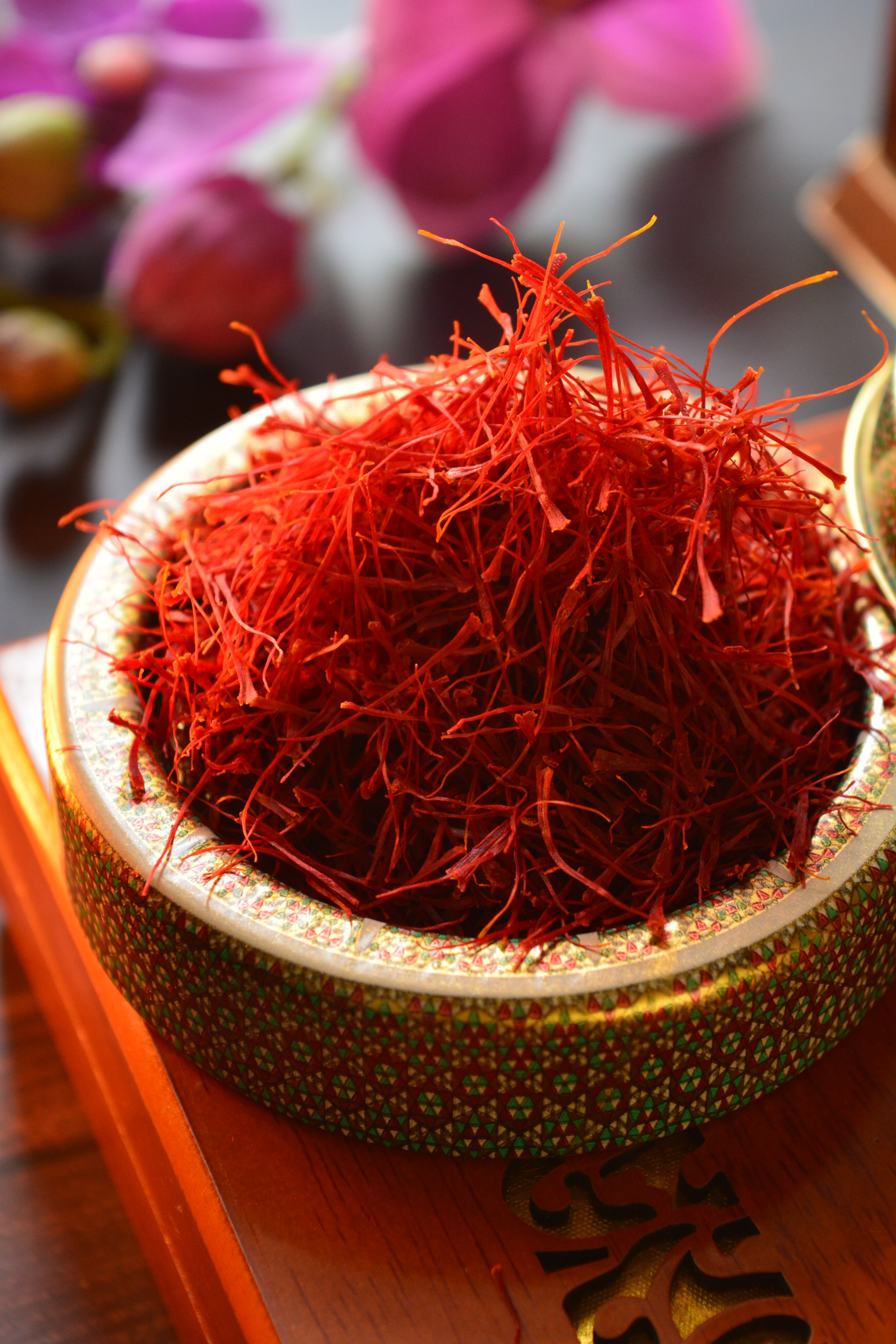
Saffron crocus, Crocus sativus, with its vivid crimson stigmas and styles

Saffron (/ˈsæfrən, -rɒn/ SAF-rən, -ron; Persian: زعفران, romanized: zafarān) is a spice derived from the sterile autumn-blooming flower of Crocus sativus, commonly known as the "saffron crocus". The vivid crimson stigma and styles (in industry jargon: 'threads') are collected and dried for use mainly as a food seasoning and colourant. Saffron crocus was slowly propagated throughout much of Eurasia and later brought to parts of North Africa, North America, even as far as Fiji in Oceania by its Indian migrant descendant population.

Saffron's taste and iodoformic or hay-like fragrance result from the phytochemicals picrocrocin and safranal. It also contains a carotenoid pigment, crocin, which imparts a rich golden-yellow hue to dishes and textiles. Saffron quality is objectively measured under the ISO 3632 standard, which evaluates the concentration of active phytochemicals—specifically crocin (color), picrocrocin (taste), and safranal (aroma) via spectrophotometric laboratory analysis. The grading depends largely on the ratio of dark red stigmas to yellow styles, with higher concentrations of red parts yielding premium-grade products. Although market prices fluctuate, premium saffron regularly exceeds US$5,000 per kilogram, sustained by its labor-intensive hand-harvesting process.

Saffron originated in the Khorasan region of northeastern Iran and descended from wild relatives in the eastern Mediterranean Sea, later spreading to the Kashmir Valley of Northwestern India, as well as the Mediterranean basin and the Asia Minor. It has been cultivated in sunny, temperate climates and traded for over 3,500 years across Eurasia, spreading through Asia via cultural exchange and conquest. Its recorded history is attested as early as a 7th-century BC Assyrian botanical treatise. Saffron is an essential ingredient in Persian cuisine used in dishes such as chelow and tahdig, stews like khoresh-e fesenjan, and desserts including sholeh-zard and bastani sonnati. Additional historical uses include traditional medicine, dyeing, perfumery, and religious rituals.

== Etymology ==
The English word saffron is a borrowing from French, first found in a Middle English text written around 1200 as saffran. It derives from the 12th-century Old French term safran, which comes from the Medieval Latin word safranum, and from the Persian زعفران zafarān. It originated from the older زر پران zarparān, meaning 'gold-strung' in reference to the flower's golden filaments or the rich golden hue it imparts as a spice.

== Species ==
=== Description ===
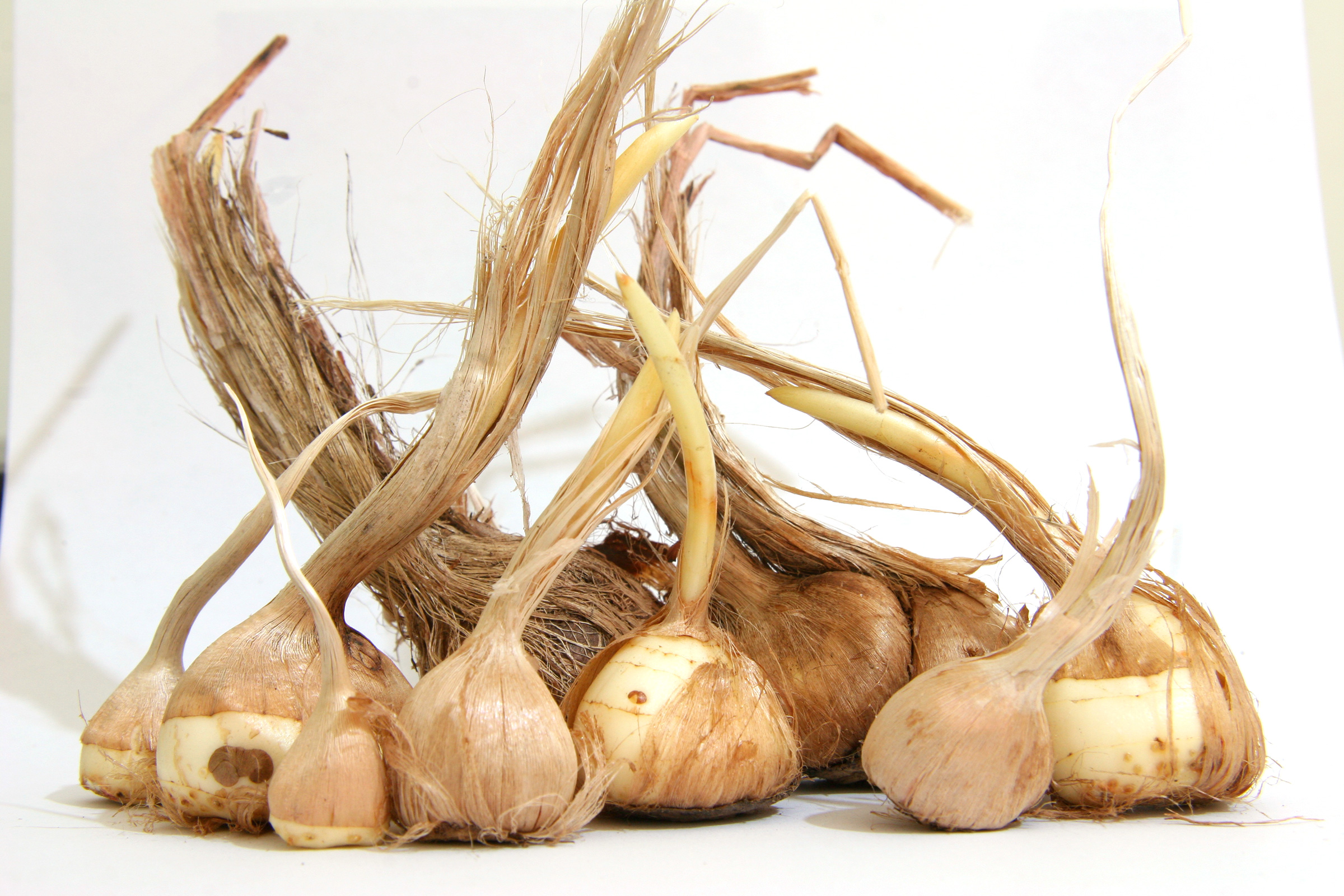
Corms

The domesticated saffron crocus, Crocus sativus, is an autumn-flowering perennial plant unknown in the wild. It possibly descends from the eastern Mediterranean autumn-flowering Crocus cartwrightianus which is also known as "wild saffron" and is native to mainland Greece, Euboea, Crete, Skyros and some islands of the Cyclades. The similar species C. thomasii and C. pallasii were considered as other possible ancestors. As a genetically monomorphic clone incapable of seed production, it was slowly propagated by humans throughout much of Eurasia. Various origins have been suggested for saffron, including Iran, Mesopotamia, India and Greece.

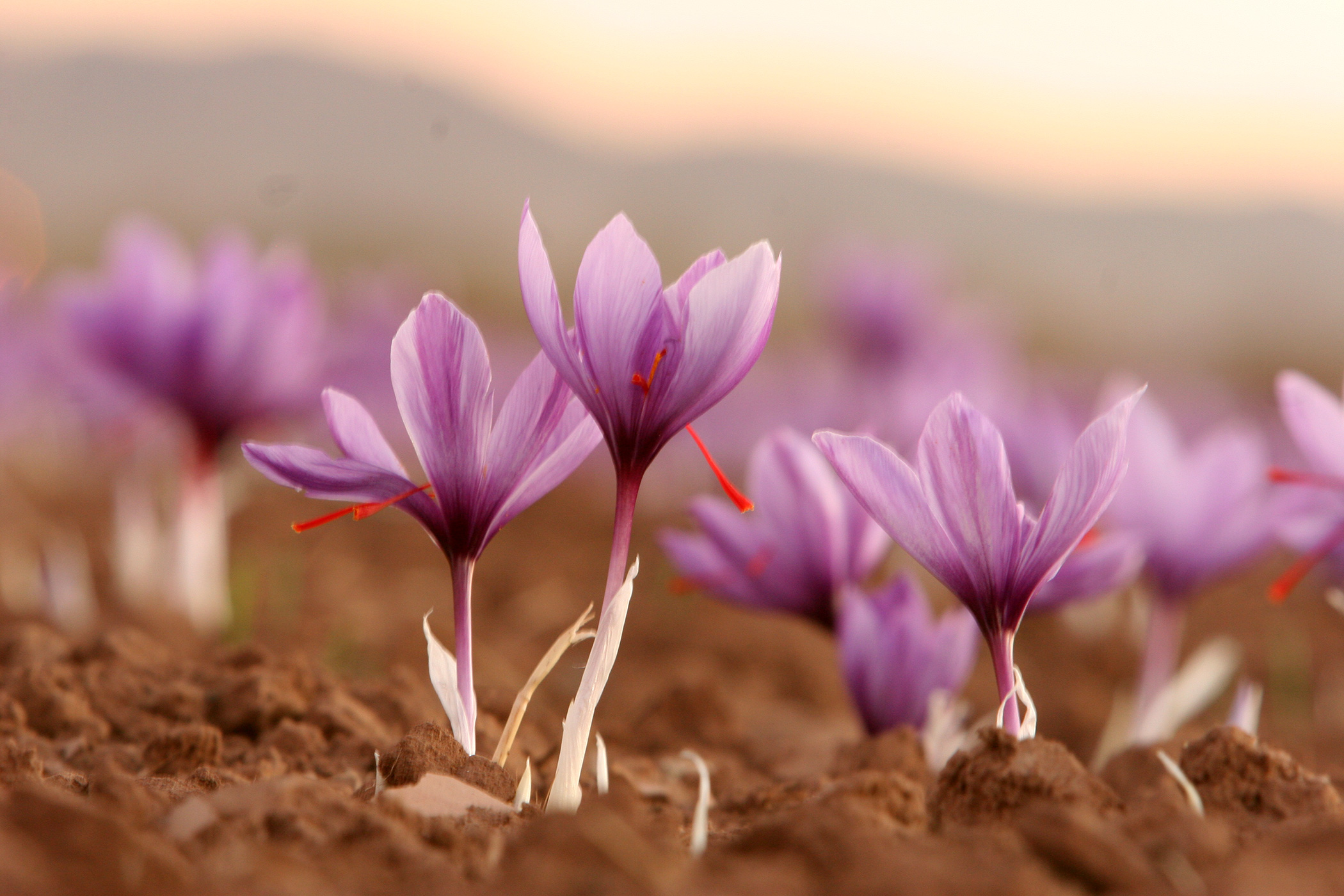
Saffron flowers with their red stigmas

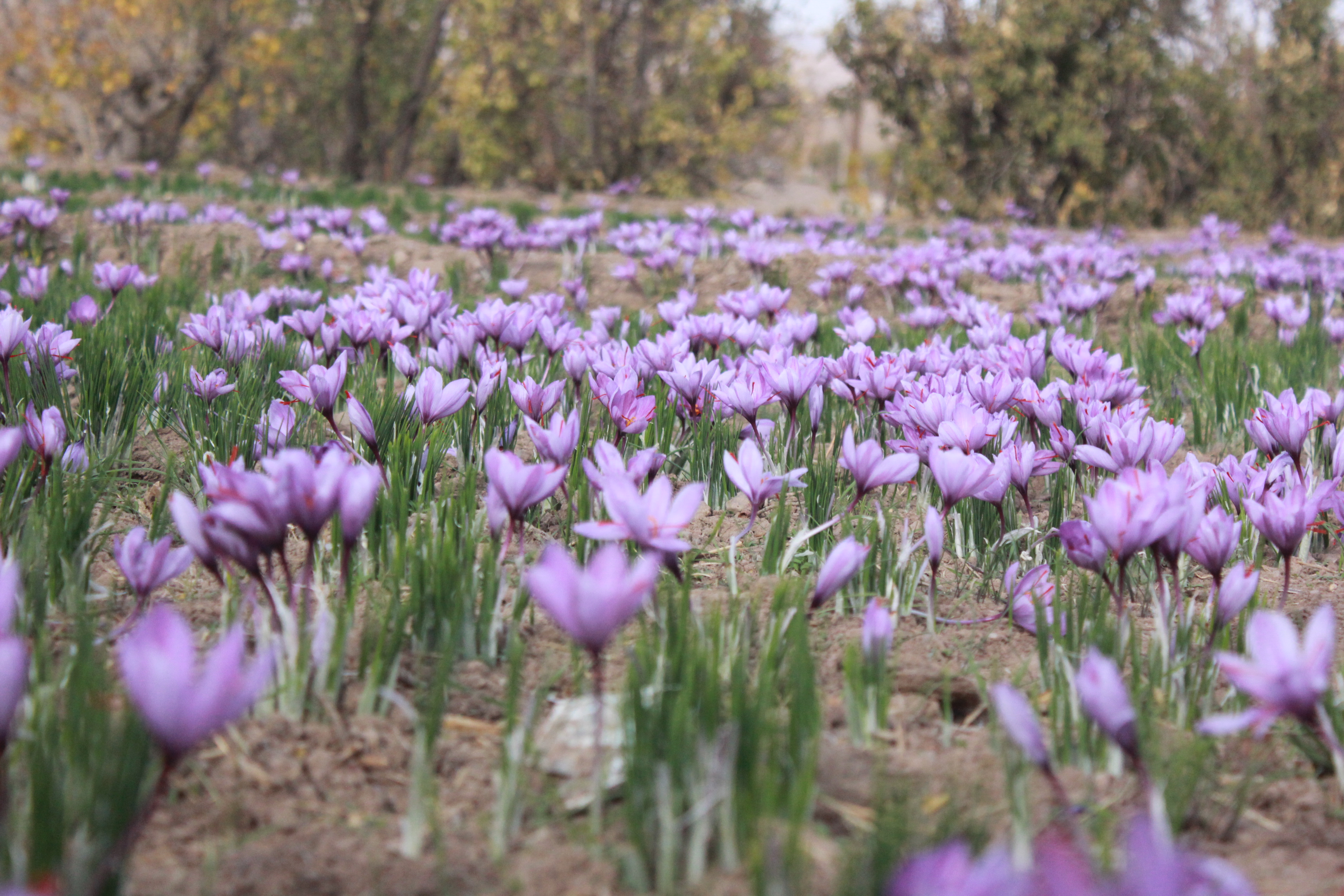
A patch full of saffron croci clusters

It is a sterile triploid form, which means that three homologous sets of chromosomes make up each specimen's genetic complement; C. sativus bears eight chromosomal bodies per set, making for 24 in total. Being sterile, the purple flowers of C. sativus fail to produce viable seeds; reproduction hinges on human assistance: clusters of corms, underground, bulb-like, starch-storing organs, must be dug up, divided, and replanted. A corm survives for one season, producing via vegetative division up to ten "cormlets" that can grow into new plants in the next season. The compact corms are small, brown globules that can measure as large as 5 cm (2 in) in diameter, have a flat base, and are shrouded in a dense mat of parallel fibres; this coat is referred to as the "corm tunic". Corms also bear vertical fibres, thin and net-like, that grow up to 5 cm (2 in) above the plant's neck.

The plant sprouts 5–11 white and non-photosynthetic leaves known as cataphylls. These membrane-like structures cover and protect 5 to 11 true leaves as they bud and develop on the crocus flower. The latter are thin, straight, and blade-like green foliage leaves, which are 1–3 mm (1/32–1/8 in), in diameter, which either expand after the flowers have opened ("hysteranthous") or do so simultaneously with their blooming ("synanthous"). C. sativus cataphylls are suspected by some to manifest prior to blooming when the plant is irrigated relatively early in the growing season. Its floral axes, or flower-bearing structures, bear bracteoles, or specialised leaves, that sprout from the flower stems; the latter are known as pedicels. After aestivating in spring, the plant sends up its true leaves, each up to 40 cm (16 in) in length. Only in October, after most other flowering plants have released their seeds, do its brilliantly hued flowers develop; they range from a light pastel shade of lilac to a darker and more striated mauve. The flowers possess a sweet, honey-like fragrance. Upon flowering, the plants are 20–30 cm (8–12 in) in height and bear up to four flowers. A three-pronged style 25–30 mm (1–1 3/16 in) in length, emerges from each flower. Each prong terminates with a vivid crimson stigma, which is the distal end of a carpel.

=== Cultivation ===
The saffron crocus, unknown in the wild, probably descends from Crocus cartwrightianus. It is a triploid that is "self-incompatible" and male sterile; it undergoes aberrant meiosis and is hence incapable of independent sexual reproduction—all propagation is by vegetative multiplication via manual "divide-and-set" of a starter clone or by interspecific hybridisation.

Crocus sativus thrives in the Mediterranean maquis, an ecotype superficially resembling the North American chaparral, and similar climates where hot and dry summer breezes sweep semi-arid lands. It can nonetheless survive cold winters, tolerating frosts as low as −10 °C (14 °F) and short periods of snow cover. Some reports suggest saffron can tolerate an air temperature range from −22 to 40 °C. Irrigation is required if grown outside of moist environments such as India's Kashmir, where annual rainfall averages 1,000–1,500 mm (40–60 in); saffron-growing regions in Greece (500 mm or 20 in annually) and Spain (400 mm or 16 in) are far drier than the main cultivating Iranian regions. What makes this possible is the timing of the local wet seasons; generous spring rains and drier summers are optimal. Rain immediately preceding flowering boosts saffron yields; rainy or cold weather during flowering promotes disease and reduces yields. Persistently damp and hot conditions harm the crops, and rabbits, rats, and birds cause damage by digging up corms. Nematodes, leaf rusts, and corm rot pose other threats. Yet Bacillus subtilis inoculation may provide some benefit to growers by speeding corm growth and increasing stigma biomass yield.

The plants fare poorly in shady conditions; they grow best in full sunlight. Fields that slope towards the sunlight are optimal (i.e., south-sloping in the Northern Hemisphere). Planting is mostly done in June in the Northern Hemisphere, where corms are lodged 7–15 cm (3–6 in) deep; its roots, stems, and leaves can develop between October and February. Planting depth and corm spacing, in concert with climate, are critical factors in determining yields. Mother corms planted deeper yield higher-quality saffron, though they form fewer flower buds and daughter corms. Italian growers optimise thread yield by planting 15 cm (6 in) deep and in rows 2–3 cm (3/4–1 1/4 in) apart; depths of 8–10 cm (3–4 in) optimise flower and corm production. Greek, Moroccan, and Spanish growers employ distinct depths and spacings that suit their locales.

C. sativus prefers friable, loose, low-density, well-watered, and well-drained clay-calcareous soils with high organic content. Traditional raised beds promote good drainage. Soil organic content was historically boosted via application of some 20–30 tonnes per hectare (9–13 short tons per acre) of manure. Afterwards, and with no further manure application, corms were planted. After a period of dormancy through the summer, the corms send up their narrow leaves and begin to bud in early autumn. Only in mid-autumn do they flower. Harvests are by necessity a speedy affair: after blossoming at dawn, flowers quickly wilt as the day passes. All plants bloom within a window of one or two weeks. Stigmas are dried quickly upon extraction and (preferably) sealed in airtight containers.

=== Harvesting ===
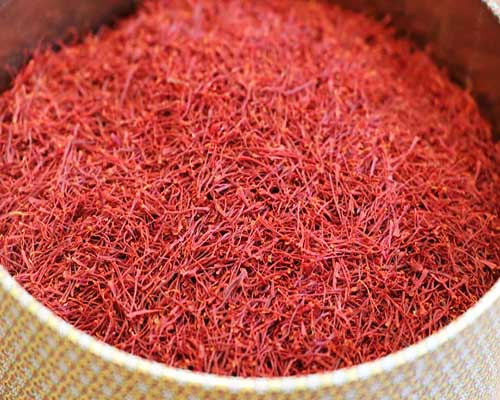
Sargol saffron, the strongest Iranian grade

The high retail value of saffron is maintained on world markets because of labour-intensive harvesting methods, which require some 440,000 hand-picked saffron stigmas per kilogram (200,000 stigmas/lb) – equivalently, 150,000 crocus flowers per kilogram (70,000 flowers/lb). Forty hours of labour are needed to pick 150,000 flowers.

One freshly picked crocus flower yields on average 30 mg of fresh saffron or 7 mg dried; roughly 150 flowers yield 1 g (1/32 oz) of dry saffron threads; to produce 12 g (7/16 oz) of dried saffron, 450 g (1 lb) of flowers are needed; the yield of dried spice from fresh saffron is only 13 g/kg (0.2 oz/lb).

== Spice ==
=== Phytochemistry and sensory properties ===
Structure of picrocrocin: β–D-glucopyranose derivative safranal moiety

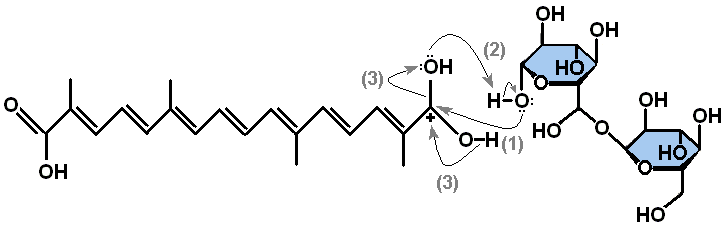
Esterification reaction between crocetin and gentiobiose. Components of α–crocin: β–D-gentiobiose / crocetin

Saffron contains some 28 volatile and aroma-yielding compounds, dominated by ketones and aldehydes. Its main aroma-active compounds are safranal – the main compound responsible for saffron aroma – 4-ketoisophorone, and dihydrooxophorone. Saffron also contains nonvolatile phytochemicals, including the carotenoids zeaxanthin, lycopene, various α- and β-carotenes, as well as crocetin and its glycoside crocein, which are the most biologically active components. Because crocetin is smaller and more water-soluble than the other carotenoids, it is more rapidly absorbed.

The yellow-orange colour of saffron is primarily the result of α-crocin. This crocin is trans-crocetin di-(β-D-gentiobiosyl) ester; it bears the systematic (IUPAC) name 8,8-diapo-8,8-carotenoic acid. This means that the crocin underlying saffron's aroma is a digentiobiose ester of the carotenoid crocetin. Crocins themselves are a series of hydrophilic carotenoids that are either monoglycosyl or diglycosyl polyene esters of crocetin. Crocetin is a conjugated polyene dicarboxylic acid that is hydrophobic, and thus oil-soluble. When crocetin is esterified with two water-soluble gentiobioses, which are sugars, a product results that is itself water-soluble. The resultant α-crocin is a carotenoid pigment that may make up more than 10% of dry saffron's mass. The two esterified gentiobioses make α-crocin ideal for colouring water-based and non-fatty foods such as rice dishes.

The bitter glucoside picrocrocin is responsible for saffron's pungent flavour. Picrocrocin (chemical formula: C_{16}H_{26}O_{7}; systematic name: 4-(β-D-glucopyranosyloxy)-2,6,6-trimethylcyclohex-1-ene-1-carbaldehyde) is a union of an aldehyde sub-molecule known as safranal (systematic name: 2,6,6-trimethylcyclohexa-1,3-diene-1-carbaldehyde) and a carbohydrate. It has insecticidal and pesticidal properties, and may comprise up to 4% of dry saffron. Picrocrocin is a truncated version of the carotenoid zeaxanthin that is produced via oxidative cleavage, and is the glycoside of the terpene aldehyde safranal.

When saffron is dried after its harvest, the heat, combined with enzymatic action, splits picrocrocin to yield D–glucose and a free safranal molecule. Safranal, a volatile oil, gives saffron much of its distinctive aroma. Safranal is less bitter than picrocrocin and may comprise up to 70% of dry saffron's volatile fraction in some samples. A second molecule underlying saffron's aroma is 2-hydroxy-4,4,6-trimethyl-2,5-cyclohexadien-1-one, which produces a scent described as saffron, dried hay-like. Chemists find this is the most powerful contributor to saffron's fragrance, despite its presence in a lesser quantity than safranal. Dry saffron is highly sensitive to fluctuating pH levels, and rapidly breaks down chemically in the presence of light and oxidising agents. It must, therefore, be stored in air-tight containers to minimise contact with atmospheric oxygen. Saffron is somewhat more resistant to heat.

=== Grades and ISO 3632 categories ===
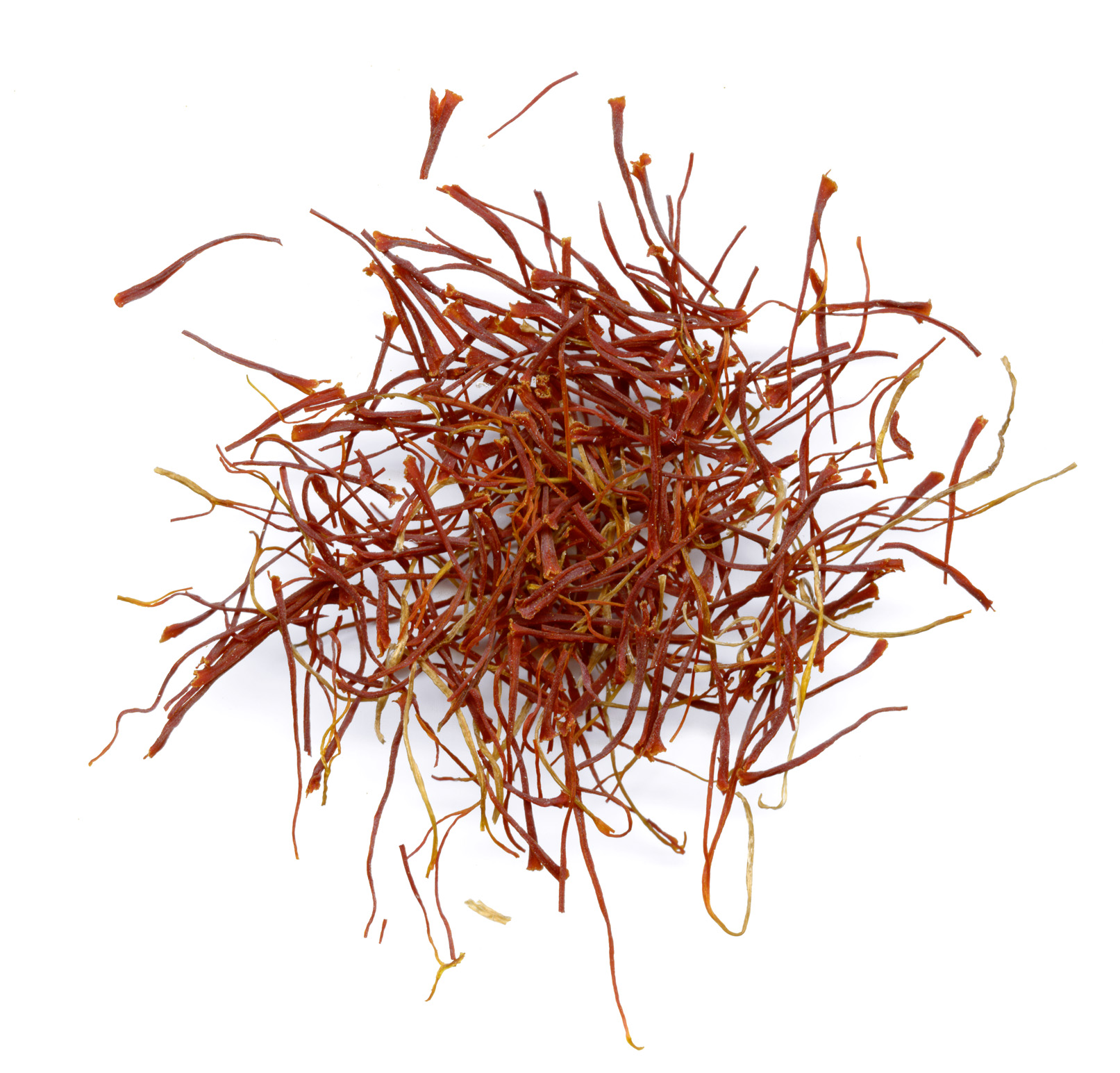
Red threads and yellow styles from Iran

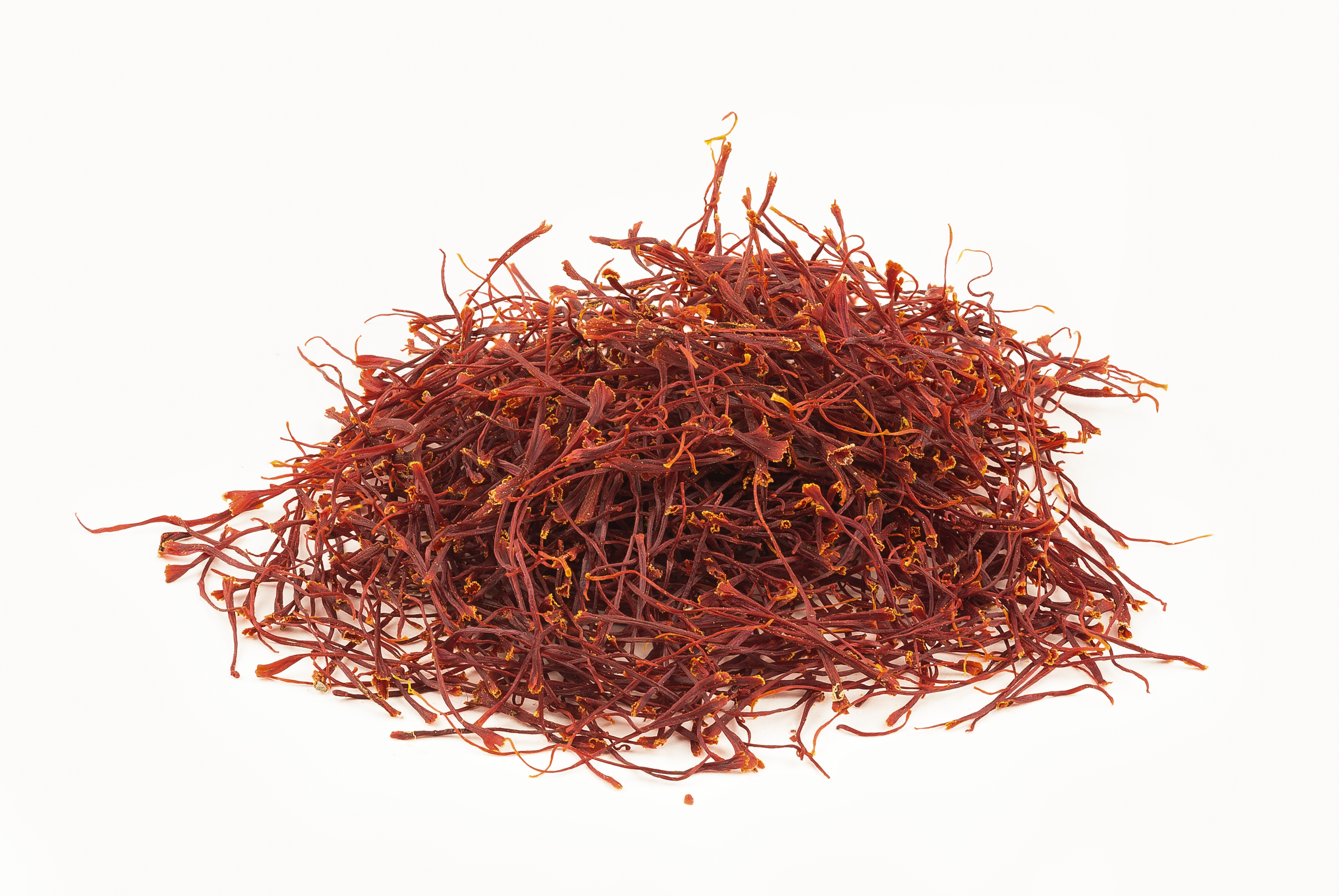
High quality red threads from Austrian saffron

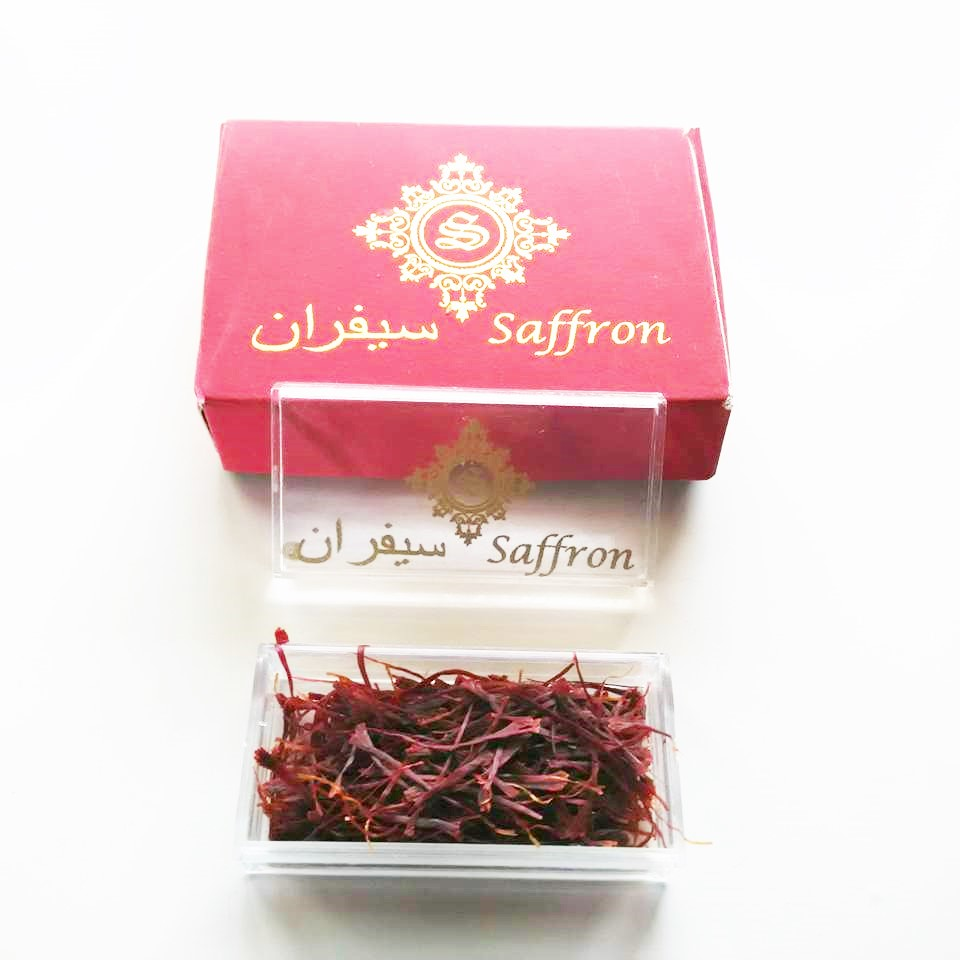
Indian saffron package

Saffron is not all of the same quality and strength. Strength is related to several factors, including age and the amount of yellow style picked relative to red stigma, as colour and flavour are concentrated in the latter.

Saffron from Iran, Spain, and India is classified into various grades according to the proportion of stigma to style it contains. Grades of Iranian saffron are: sargol (Persian: سرگل, red stigma tips only, strongest grade), pushal or pushali (red stigmas plus some yellow style, lower strength), "bunch" saffron (red stigmas plus large amount of yellow style, presented in a tiny bundle like a miniature wheatsheaf) and konge (yellow style only, claimed to have aroma but with very little, if any, colouring potential). Grades of Spanish saffron are coupé (the strongest grade, like Iranian sargol), mancha (like Iranian pushal), and in order of further decreasing strength rio, standard and sierra saffron. The word mancha in the Spanish classification can have two meanings: a general grade of saffron or a very high quality Spanish-grown saffron from a specific geographical origin. Real Spanish-grown La Mancha saffron has PDO protected status, which is displayed on the product packaging. Spanish growers fought hard for Protected Status because they felt that imports of Iranian saffron re-packaged in Spain and sold as "Spanish Mancha saffron" were undermining the genuine La Mancha brand. Similar was the case in Indian Kashmir where imported Iranian saffron is mixed with local saffron and sold as "Kashmir brand" at a higher price. In India, saffron is mostly classified into two main categories called mongra (stigma alone) and lachha (stigmas attached with parts of the style). Countries producing less saffron do not have specialised words for different grades and may only produce one grade. Artisan producers in Europe and New Zealand have offset their higher labour charges for saffron harvesting by targeting quality, only offering extremely high-grade saffron.

In addition to descriptions based on how the saffron is picked, saffron may be categorised under the international standard ISO 3632 after laboratory measurement of crocin (responsible for saffron's colour), picrocrocin (taste), and safranal (fragrance or aroma) content. However, often there is no clear grading information on the product packaging and little of the saffron readily available in the UK is labelled with ISO category. This lack of information makes it hard for customers to make informed choices when comparing prices and buying saffron.

Under ISO 3632, determination of non-stigma content ("floral waste content") and other extraneous matter such as inorganic material ("ash") are also key. Grading standards are set by the International Organization for Standardization, a federation of national standards bodies. ISO 3632 deals exclusively with saffron and establishes three categories: III (poorest quality), II, and I (finest quality). Formerly there was also category IV, which was below category III. Samples are assigned categories by gauging the spice's crocin and picrocrocin content, revealed by measurements of specific spectrophotometric absorbance. Safranal is treated slightly differently and rather than there being threshold levels for each category, samples must give a reading of 20–50 for all categories.

These data are measured through spectrophotometry reports at certified testing laboratories worldwide. Higher absorbances imply greater levels of crocin, picrocrocin and safranal, and thus a greater colouring potential and therefore strength per gram. The absorbance reading of crocin is known as the "colouring strength" of that saffron. Saffron's colouring strength can range from lower than 80 (for all category IV saffron) up to 200 or greater (for category I). The world's finest samples (the selected, most red-maroon, tips of stigmas picked from the finest flowers) receive colouring strengths in excess of 250, making such saffron over three times more powerful than category IV saffron. Market prices for saffron types follow directly from these ISO categories. Sargol and coupé saffron would typically fall into ISO 3632 category I. Pushal and Mancha would probably be assigned to category II. On many saffron packaging labels, neither the ISO 3632 category nor the colouring strength (the measurement of crocin content) is displayed.

However, many growers, traders, and consumers reject such lab test numbers. Some people prefer a more holistic method of sampling batches of threads for taste, aroma, pliability, and other traits in a fashion similar to that practised by experienced wine tasters.

=== Adulteration ===
Despite attempts at quality control and standardisation, an extensive history of saffron adulteration, particularly among the cheapest grades, continues into modern times. Adulteration was first documented in Europe's Middle Ages, when those found selling adulterated saffron in Nuremberg were executed under the Safranschou code. Typical methods include mixing in extraneous substances like beetroot, pomegranate fibres, red-dyed silk fibres, or the saffron crocus's tasteless and odourless yellow stamens. Other methods included dousing saffron fibres with viscid substances like honey or vegetable oil to increase their weight. Powdered saffron is more prone to adulteration, with turmeric, paprika, and other powders used as diluting fillers. Adulteration can also consist of selling mislabelled mixes of different saffron grades. Thus, high-grade Indian Kashmiri saffron is often sold and mixed with cheaper Iranian imports; these mixes are then marketed as pure Kashmiri saffron. Safflower is a common substitute sometimes sold as saffron. The spice is reportedly counterfeited with horse hair, corn silk, or shredded paper. Tartrazine or sunset yellow dyes have been used to colour counterfeit powdered saffron.

In recent years, saffron adulterated with the colouring extract of gardenia fruits has been detected in the European market. This form of fraud is difficult to detect due to the presence of flavonoids and crocines in the gardenia-extracts similar to those naturally occurring in saffron. Detection methods have been developed by using HPLC and mass spectrometry to determine the presence of geniposide, a compound present in the fruits of gardenia, but not in saffron.

=== Types ===
The various saffron crocus cultivars give rise to thread types that are often regionally distributed and characteristically distinct. Varieties (not varieties in the botanical sense) from Spain, including the tradenames "Spanish Superior" and "Creme", are generally mellower in colour, flavour, and aroma; they are graded by government-imposed standards. Italian varieties are slightly more potent than Spanish. Greek saffron produced in the town of Krokos is PDO protected due to its particularly high-quality colour and strong flavour. Various "boutique" crops are available from New Zealand, France, Switzerland, England, the United States, and other countries—some of them organically grown. In the US, Pennsylvania Dutch saffron—known for its "earthy" notes—is produced in small quantities.

Consumers may regard certain cultivars as "premium" quality. The "Aquila" saffron, or zafferano dell'Aquila, is defined by high safranal and crocin content, distinctive thread shape, unusually pungent aroma, and intense colour; it is grown exclusively on eight hectares in the Navelli Valley of Italy's Abruzzo region, near L'Aquila. It was first introduced to Italy by a Dominican friar from inquisition-era Spain. But the biggest saffron cultivation in Italy is in San Gavino Monreale, Sardinia, where it is grown on 40 hectares, representing 60% of Italian production; it too has unusually high crocin, picrocrocin, and safranal content.

Another is the "Mongra" or "Lacha" saffron of India's Kashmir (Crocus sativus 'Cashmirianus'), which is among the most difficult for consumers to obtain. Repeated droughts, blights, and crop failures in Kashmir combined with an Indian export ban, contribute to its prohibitive overseas prices. Indian saffron is recognizable by its dark maroon-purple hue, making it among the world's darkest. In 2020, Kashmiri saffron was certified with a geographical indication from the Government of India (GoI).

== World production ==
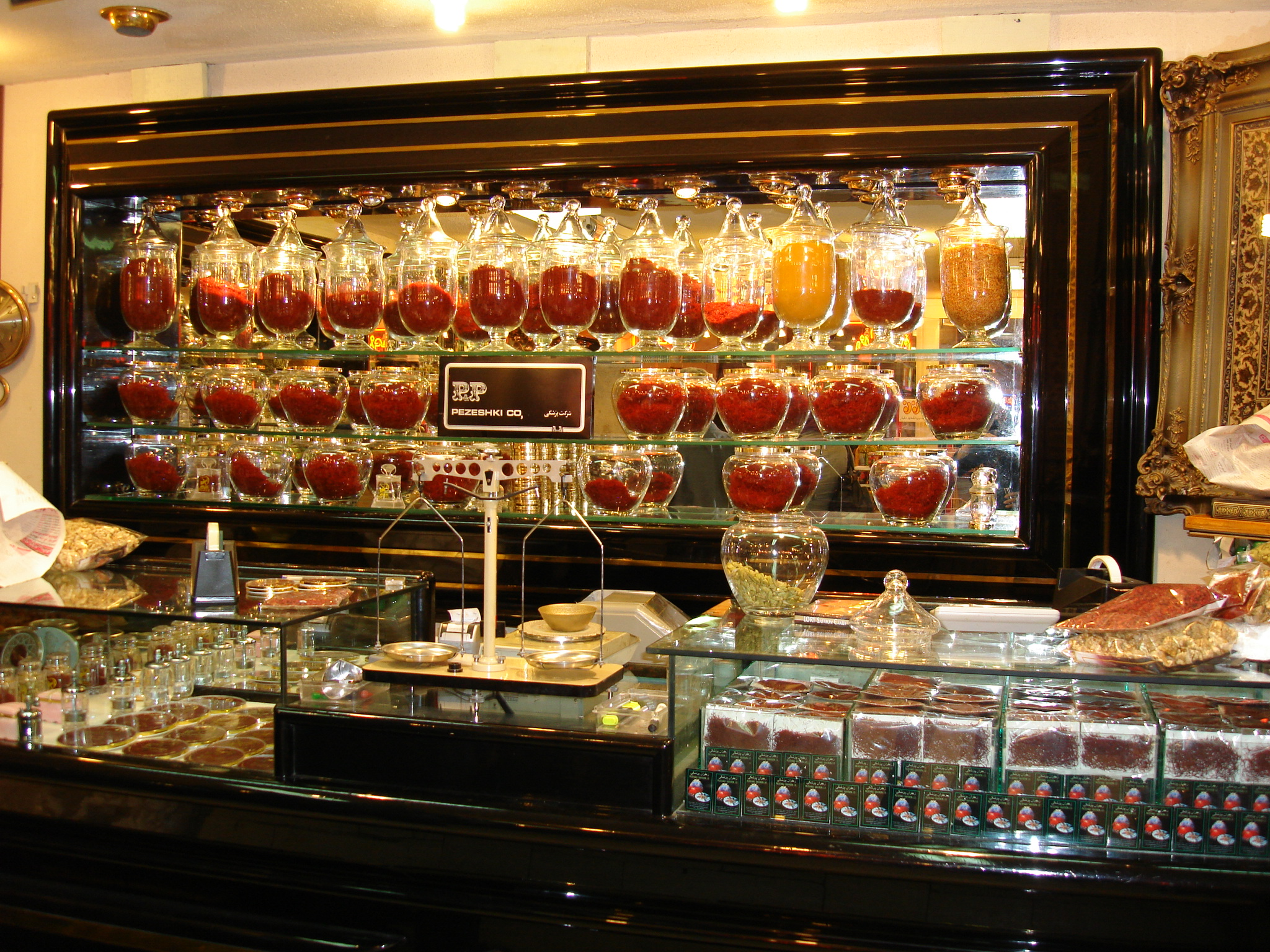
Saffron market in Mashad, Iran.

Almost all saffron grows in a belt stretching from Spain in the west to India in the east. Iran is responsible for around 90% of global production, and in 2024 was the largest producer, followed by Afghanistan. Saffron is cultivated in 26 of Afghanistan's 34 provinces, with most production concentrated in Herat.

Greece is the third largest producer, followed by Spain, which was once the largest producer in the 19th century. Other producers include the United Arab Emirates, India, and Morocco.

=== Trade ===
Saffron prices at wholesale and retail rates range from $1,100–$11,000/kg ($500–$5,000/lb). In Western countries, the average retail price in 1974 was $2,200/kg ($1,000/lb).

== Uses ==
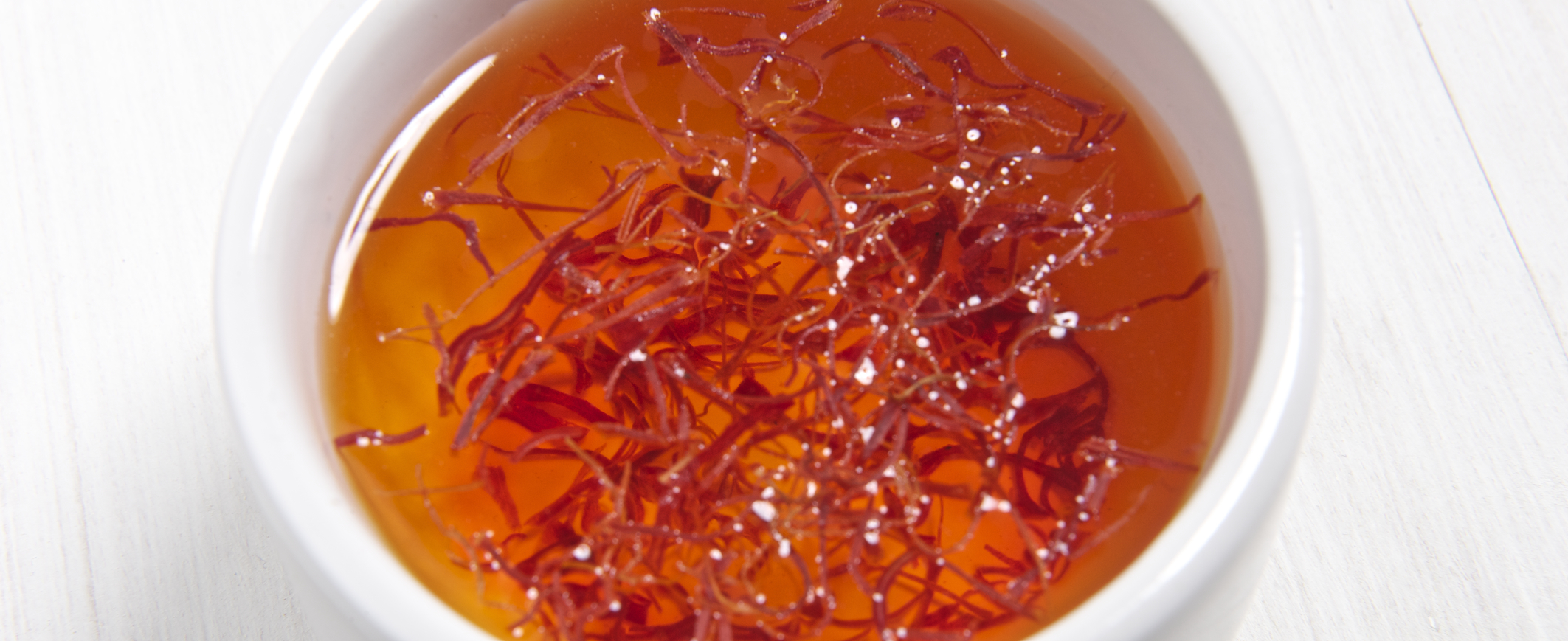
Saffron threads soaked in hot water prior to use in food preparation

The primary use of saffron is in food and drink preparation. Saffron has a long history of use in traditional medicine. Saffron has also been used as a fabric dye, particularly in China and India, and in perfumery. It is used for religious purposes in India.

In the European E number categorisation for food elements and additives, Saffron is coded as E164.

Dried saffron
Nutritional value per 1 tbsp (15 mL) (2.1 g)
- Energy: 27 kJ (6.5 kcal)
- Carbohydrates: 1.37 g
- Dietary fibre: 0.10 g
- Fat: 0.12 g
- Saturated: 0.03 g
- Trans: 0.00 g
- Monounsaturated: 0.01 g
- Polyunsaturated: 0.04 g
- Protein: 0.24 g
Vitamins and minerals
Vitamins	Quantity %DV^{†}
Vitamin A	11 IU
Thiamine (B1)	0% 0 mg
Riboflavin (B2)	1% 0.01 mg
Niacin (B3)	0% 0.03 mg
Vitamin B6	1% 0.02 mg
Folate (B9)	1% 2 μg
Vitamin B12	0% 0 μg
Vitamin C	2% 1.7 mg
Vitamin D	0% 0 μg
Vitamin D	0% 0 IU
Minerals	Quantity %DV^{†}
Calcium	0% 2 mg
Copper	1% 0.01 mg
Iron	1% 0.23 mg
Magnesium	1% 6 mg
Manganese	26% 0.6 mg
Phosphorus	0% 5 mg
Potassium	1% 36 mg
Selenium	0% 0.1 μg
Sodium	0% 3 mg
Zinc	0% 0.02 mg
- Other constituents: Quantity
- Water: 0.25 g
- Full Link to USDA database entry
- ^{†}Percentages estimated using US recommendations for adults, except for potassium, which is estimated based on expert recommendation from the National Academies.

=== Nutrition ===
Dried saffron is 65% carbohydrates, 6% fat, 11% protein (table) and 12% water. In one tablespoon (2 grams; a quantity much larger than is likely to be ingested in normal use) manganese is present as 29% of the Daily Value, while other micronutrients have negligible content (table).

=== Consumption ===
Saffron's aroma is often described by connoisseurs as reminiscent of metallic honey with grassy or hay-like notes, while its taste has also been noted as hay-like and sweet. Consumed in large servings—more than a few threads per person per dish—saffron is experienced as bitter. Saffron also contributes a luminous yellow-orange colouring to foods. Saffron is widely used in Persian, Indian, European, and Arab cuisines. Confectioneries and liquors also often include saffron. Saffron is used in dishes ranging from the jewelled rice and khoresh of Iran, the Milanese risotto of Italy, the paella of Spain, the bouillabaisse of France, to the biryani with various meat accompaniments in South Asia. Saffron is also used in the preparation of the Golden Ham, a precious dry-cured ham made with saffron from San Gimignano in Tuscany. Common saffron substitutes include safflower (Carthamus tinctorius, which is often sold as "Portuguese saffron" or "açafrão"), annatto, and turmeric (Curcuma longa). In Medieval Europe, turmeric was also known as "Indian saffron" because of its yellow-orange colour.

=== Toxicity ===
Ingesting less than 1.5 g (1/16 oz) of saffron is not toxic for humans, but doses greater than 5 g (3/16 oz) can become increasingly toxic. Mild toxicity includes dizziness, nausea, vomiting, and diarrhea, whereas at higher doses there can be reduced platelet count and spontaneous bleeding.

=== Drug interactions ===
In high doses, saffron extract has extensive interactions with prescribed drugs, one of which is its inhibition of platelet aggregation in people taking anticoagulant or antiplatelet drugs. As of 2026, saffron extract may interact with some 214 drugs, dietary supplements, and food components, with 78% of the interactions rated as minor.

=== Research ===
Saffron is under preliminary research to assess its potential effect on depression and anxiety.

A 2024 review reported that consuming saffron supplements for 8–12 weeks was associated with lowering of some cardiometabolic markers, such as fasting blood glucose, glycated hemoglobin, and blood lipids, in overweight diabetic or prediabetic people.

== History ==
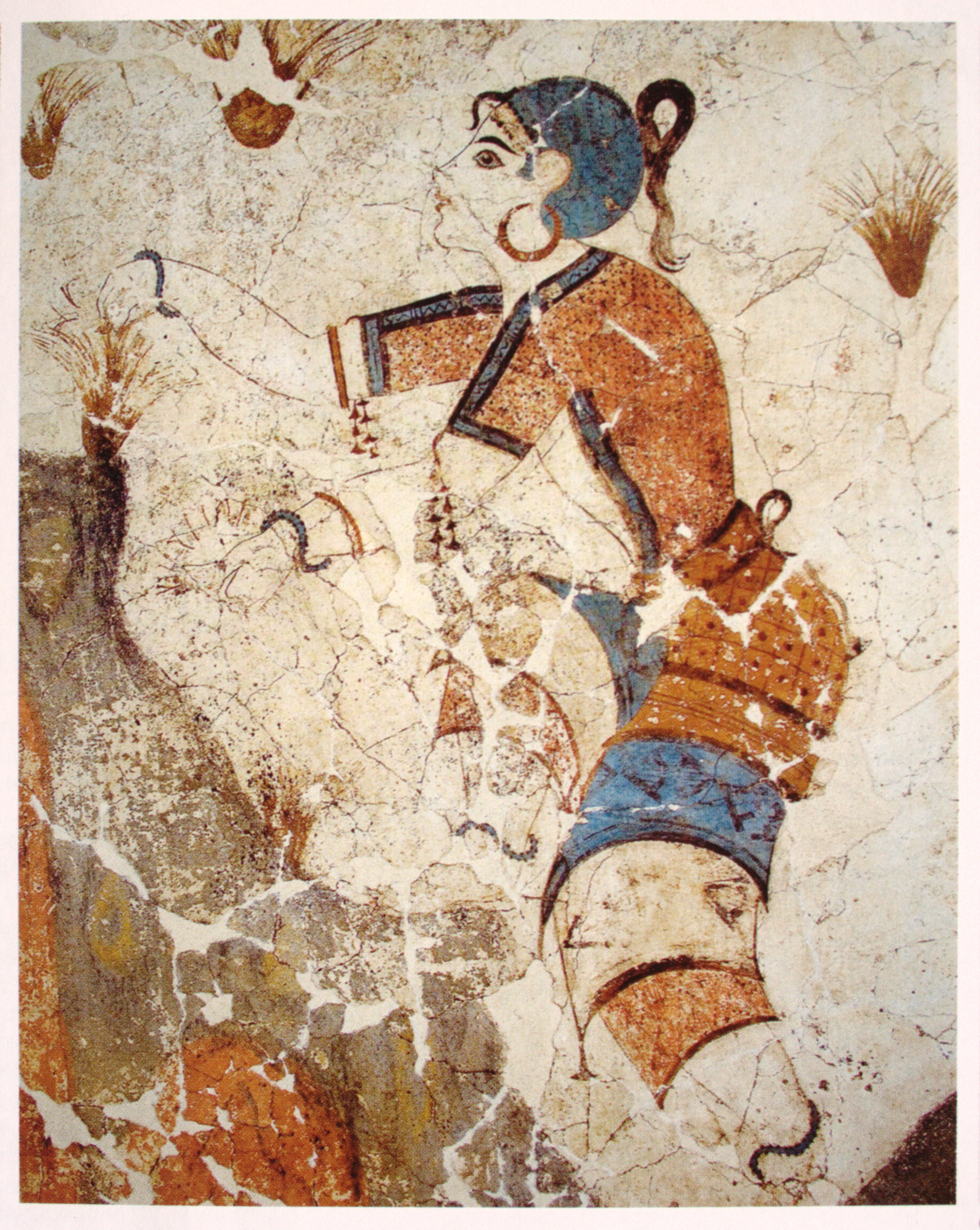
A detail from the "Saffron Gatherers" fresco of the "Xeste 3" building in the Bronze Age settlement of Akrotiri on the Aegean island of Santorini. It is one of many depicting saffron preserved at the excavation site

Saffron likely originated in Iran, Greece, Mesopotamia, or India. Harold McGee states that it was domesticated in or near Greece during the Bronze Age. C. sativus is probably a triploid form of Crocus cartwrightianus, which is also known as "wild saffron". Saffron crocus was slowly propagated by humans throughout much of Eurasia and was later brought to parts of North Africa, North America, and Oceania.

Several wild species of Crocus similar to the commercial plant are known to have been harvested in recent times for use as saffron. Crocus ancyrensis was used to make saffron in Sivas in Central Turkey, the corms were also eaten. Crocus cartwrightianus was harvested on Andros in the islands of the Cyclades, for medicinal purposes and the stigmas for making a pigment called Zafran. Crocus longiflorus stigmas were used for saffron in Sicily. Crocus thomasii stigmas were used to flavour dishes around Taranto, South Italy. In Syria the stigmas of an unknown wild species were collected by women and children, sun-dried and pressed into small tablets which were sold in the Bazaars. Not all ancient depictions or descriptions of saffron spice or flowers are certain to be the same species as the modern commercial species used for spice.

=== Mediterranean ===
Saffron was likely domesticated in or near Greece during the Bronze Age. Traditional cultivated areas of saffron in Europe include Spain, Italy and Greece. In particular, Greece is considered as one of the main producer countries, alongside Iran and India.

Minoan depictions of saffron are now considered to be Crocus cartwrightianus. The Minoans portrayed saffron in their palace frescoes by 1600–1500 BC; they hint at its possible use as a therapeutic drug. Ancient Greek legends told of sea voyages to Cilicia, where adventurers sought what they believed were the world's most valuable threads. Another legend tells of Crocus and Smilax, whereby Crocus is bewitched and transformed into the first saffron crocus. Ancient perfumers in Egypt, physicians in Gaza, townspeople in Rhodes, and the Greek hetaerae courtesans used saffron in their scented waters, perfumes and potpourris, mascaras and ointments, divine offerings, and medical treatments.

In late Ptolemaic Egypt, Cleopatra used saffron in her baths so that lovemaking would be more pleasurable. Egyptian healers used saffron as a treatment for all varieties of gastrointestinal ailments. Saffron was also used as a fabric dye in such Levantine cities as Sidon and Tyre in Lebanon. Aulus Cornelius Celsus prescribes saffron in medicines for wounds, cough, colic, and scabies, and in the mithridatium.

In 7th century Crete, the locals prepared makarogia (Greek: µακαρώγια), a pasta-like dish, usually spicing it with saffron, which they called zaforan (Greek: ζαφοράν). It was also called krokon (Greek: κρόκον). According to Gregory of Nazianzus, saffron was used to damp wine, while Theodoros Prodromos described a saffron-based dish, which seems to have been a complex, spiced fish broth, combining nard (spikenard), cloves, cinnamon, vinegar, unmixed honey and saffron, the last being the main ingredient of this dish.

In the modern era in Greece the main cultivation area is Kozani, Macedonia, and in Spain the main areas of cultivation are La Mancha and Castile and León.

=== West Asia ===
Documentation of the use of saffron over the span of 3,500 years has been uncovered. Saffron-based pigments have indeed been found in 50,000-year-old depictions of prehistoric places in northwest Iran. The Sumerians later used wild-growing saffron in their remedies and magical potions. It was also known in ancient Egypt, as indicated by a 2000 BC papyrus. Saffron was an article of long-distance trade before the Minoan palace culture's 2nd millennium BC peak. Ancient Persians cultivated Persian saffron (Crocus sativus var. haussknechtii now called Crocus haussknechtii by botanists) in Derbent, Isfahan, and Khorasan by the 10th century BC. At such sites, saffron threads were woven into textiles, ritually offered to divinities, and used in dyes, perfumes, medicines, and body washes. Saffron threads would thus be scattered across beds and mixed into hot teas as a curative for bouts of melancholy. Non-Persians also feared the Persians' usage of saffron as a drugging agent and aphrodisiac.

Saffron is featured in trade lists from Mari, Syria, is described in a 7th-century BC Assyrian botanical reference compiled under Ashurbanipal, and is listed among other aromatic plants in the Hebrew Bible, in Song of Songs 4:14. During his Asian campaigns, Alexander the Great used Persian saffron in his infusions, rice, and baths as a curative for battle wounds. Alexander's troops imitated the practice from the Persians and brought saffron-bathing to Greece.

=== South Asia ===
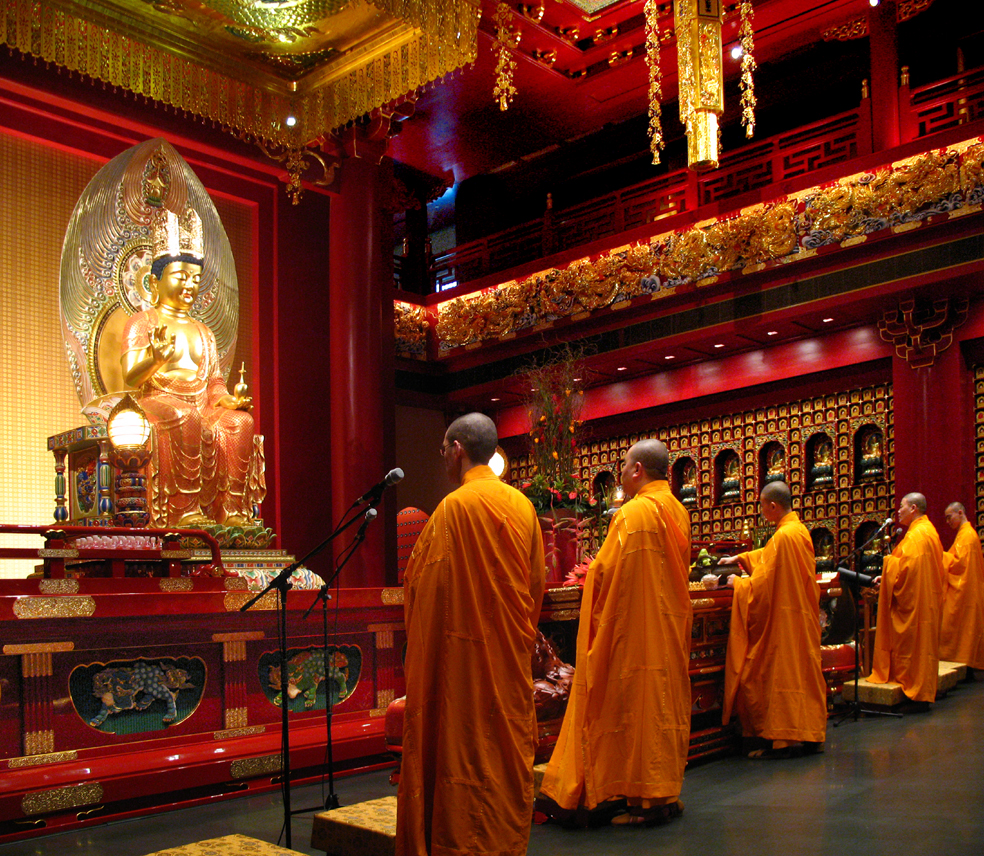
Buddhist adepts wearing saffron-coloured robes, pray in the Hundred Dragons Hall, Buddha Tooth Relic Temple and Museum, Singapore.

Conflicting theories explain saffron's arrival in South Asia. Indian Kashmiri and Chinese accounts date its arrival anywhere between 2500 and 900 years ago. Historians studying ancient Persian records date the arrival to sometime prior to 500 BC, attributing it to a Persian transplantation of saffron corms to stock new gardens and parks. Phoenicians then marketed Indian saffron as a dye and a treatment for melancholy. Its use in foods and dyes subsequently spread throughout India. Buddhist monks wear saffron-coloured robes; however, the robes are not dyed with costly saffron but turmeric, a less expensive dye, or jackfruit. Monks' robes are dyed the same colour to show equality with each other, and turmeric or ochre were the cheapest, most readily available dyes. Gamboge is also used to dye the robes.

=== East Asia ===
Some historians believe that saffron came to China with Mongol invaders from Persia. In the field of traditional Chinese medicine, it was first mentioned in the Yinshan zhengyao as an ingredient to treat "internal blazing of heart fire". Shennong Bencaojing, a pharmacopoeia written around 300–200 BC and traditionally credited to the legendary Yan Emperor and the deity Shennong, also mentions saffron among 252 plant-based medical treatments for various disorders. Nevertheless, around the 3rd century AD, the Chinese were referring to it as having an Indian provenance through the Silk Road. According to the herbalist Wan Zhen, "the habitat of saffron is in Kashmir, where people grow it principally to offer it to the Buddha". Wan also reflected on how it was used in his time: "The flower withers after a few days, and then the saffron is obtained. It is valued for its uniform yellow colour. It can be used to aromatise wine." Saffron is a less common food colouring ingredient in local Chinese cuisines than safflower.

Since the 1970s, Chinese saffron farming has begun in Maqiao, Shanghai's Minhang district, as well as in Changji, Xinjiang.

=== Western Europe ===
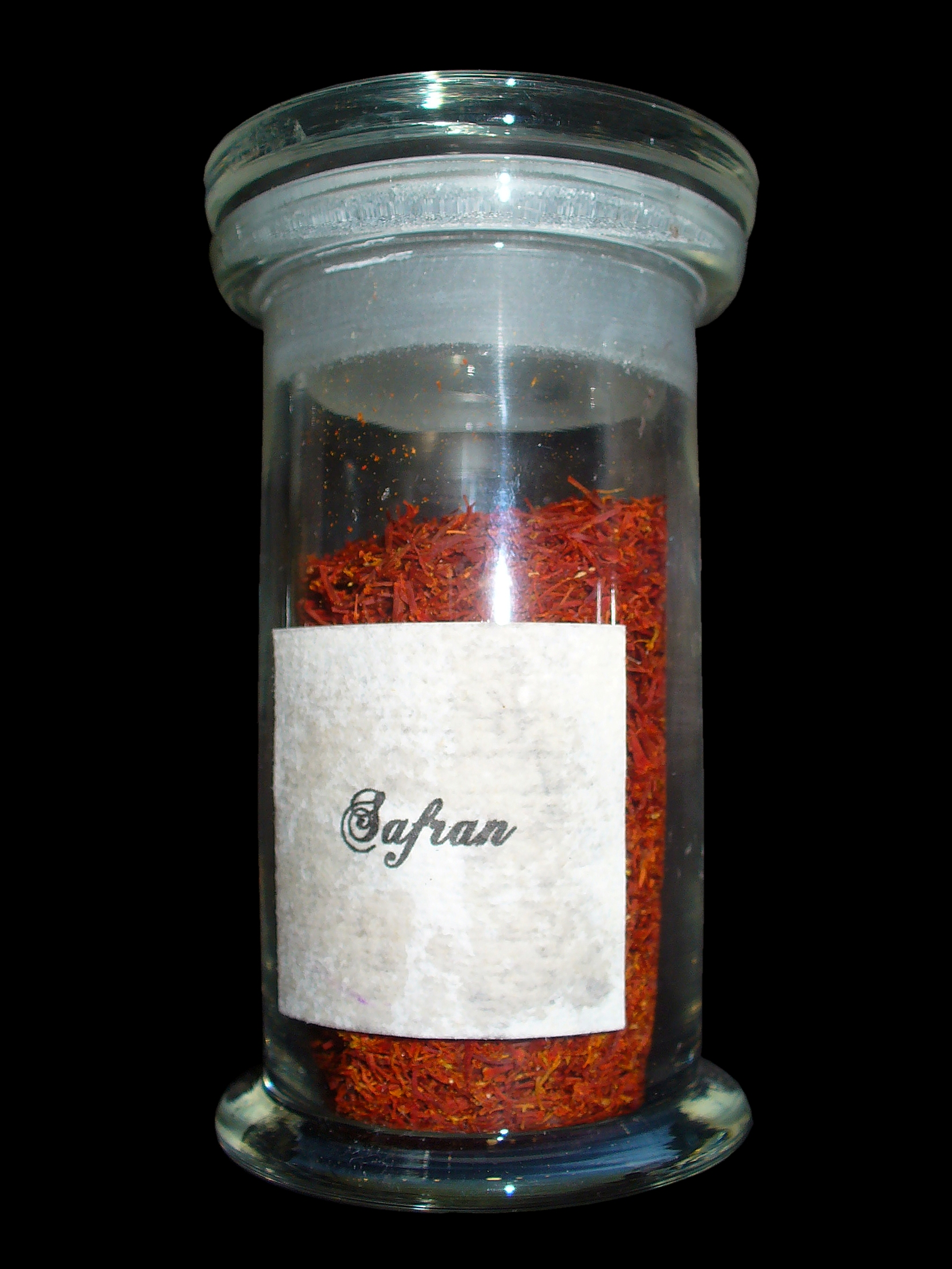
Preserved "Safran", Staatliches Museum für Naturkunde, Karlsruhe, Germany

Saffron was a notable ingredient in certain Roman recipes such as jusselle and conditum. Such was the Romans' love of saffron that Roman colonists took it with them when they settled in southern Gaul, where it was extensively cultivated until Rome's fall. With this fall, European saffron cultivation plummeted. Competing theories state that saffron only returned to France with 8th-century AD Moors or with the Avignon papacy in the 14th century AD. Similarly, the spread of Islamic civilisation may have helped reintroduce the crop to Spain and Italy.

The 14th-century Black Death caused demand for saffron-based medicaments to peak, and Europe imported large quantities of threads via Venetian and Genoan ships from southern and Mediterranean lands such as Rhodes. The theft of one such shipment by noblemen sparked the fourteen-week-long Saffron War. The conflict and resulting fear of rampant saffron piracy spurred corm cultivation in Basel; it thereby grew prosperous. The crop then spread to Nuremberg, where endemic and insalubrious adulteration brought on the Safranschou code—whereby culprits were variously fined, imprisoned, and executed. Meanwhile, cultivation continued in southern France, Italy, and Spain.

Direct archaeological evidence of mediaeval saffron consumption in Scandinavia comes from the wreck of the royal Danish-Norwegian flagship, Gribshunden. The ship sank in 1495 while on a diplomatic mission to Sweden. Excavations in 2021 revealed concentrations of saffron threads and small "pucks" of compressed saffron powder, along with fresh ginger, cloves, and pepper. Surprisingly, the saffron retained its distinctive odour even after more than 500 years of submersion in the Baltic Sea.

The Essex town of Saffron Walden, named for its new specialty crop, emerged as a prime saffron growing and trading centre in the 16th and 17th centuries but cultivation there was abandoned; saffron was re-introduced around 2013 as well as other parts of the UK (Cheshire).

=== The Americas ===
Europeans introduced saffron to the Americas when immigrant members of the Schwenkfelder Church left Europe with a trunk containing its corms. Church members had grown it widely in Europe. By 1730, the Pennsylvania Dutch cultivated saffron throughout eastern Pennsylvania. Spanish colonies in the Caribbean bought large amounts of this new American saffron, and high demand ensured that saffron's list price on the Philadelphia commodities exchange was equal to gold. Trade with the Caribbean later collapsed in the aftermath of the War of 1812, when many saffron-bearing merchant vessels were destroyed. Yet the Pennsylvania Dutch continued to grow lesser amounts of saffron for local trade and use in their cakes, noodles, and chicken or trout dishes. American saffron cultivation survives into modern times, mainly in Lancaster County, Pennsylvania.

=== Afghanistan ===
Saffron has a long history in Afghanistan, with cultivation believed to date back to before Alexander the Great's conquest of the Persian Empire. Due to prolonged droughts, conflict, and shifts in agricultural focus, saffron farming declined for centuries. Cultivation resumed in the early 2000s as an alternative to opium poppy farming, supported by international organizations and the Afghan government. According to Afghanistan's Ministry of Agriculture, Irrigation, and Livestock, production increased from 20 metric tons in 2022 to 46 metric tons in 2024. Key export markets include India, Europe, and the United States, where Afghan saffron is prized for its high quality.

Saffron cultivation contributes significantly to Afghanistan's economy, supporting thousands of farmers, particularly women. Over 80% of the saffron workforce consists of women, who primarily handle harvesting and processing. The sector has provided employment opportunities for over 40,000 people, playing a role in agricultural sustainability and rural development.

Afghan saffron is known for its deep red color, strong aroma, and high crocin content, a compound that determines color intensity. It has been ranked among the highest quality saffron varieties in recent years with a 310 Crocin color quality based on ISO 3632.2 standards.

== Gallery ==
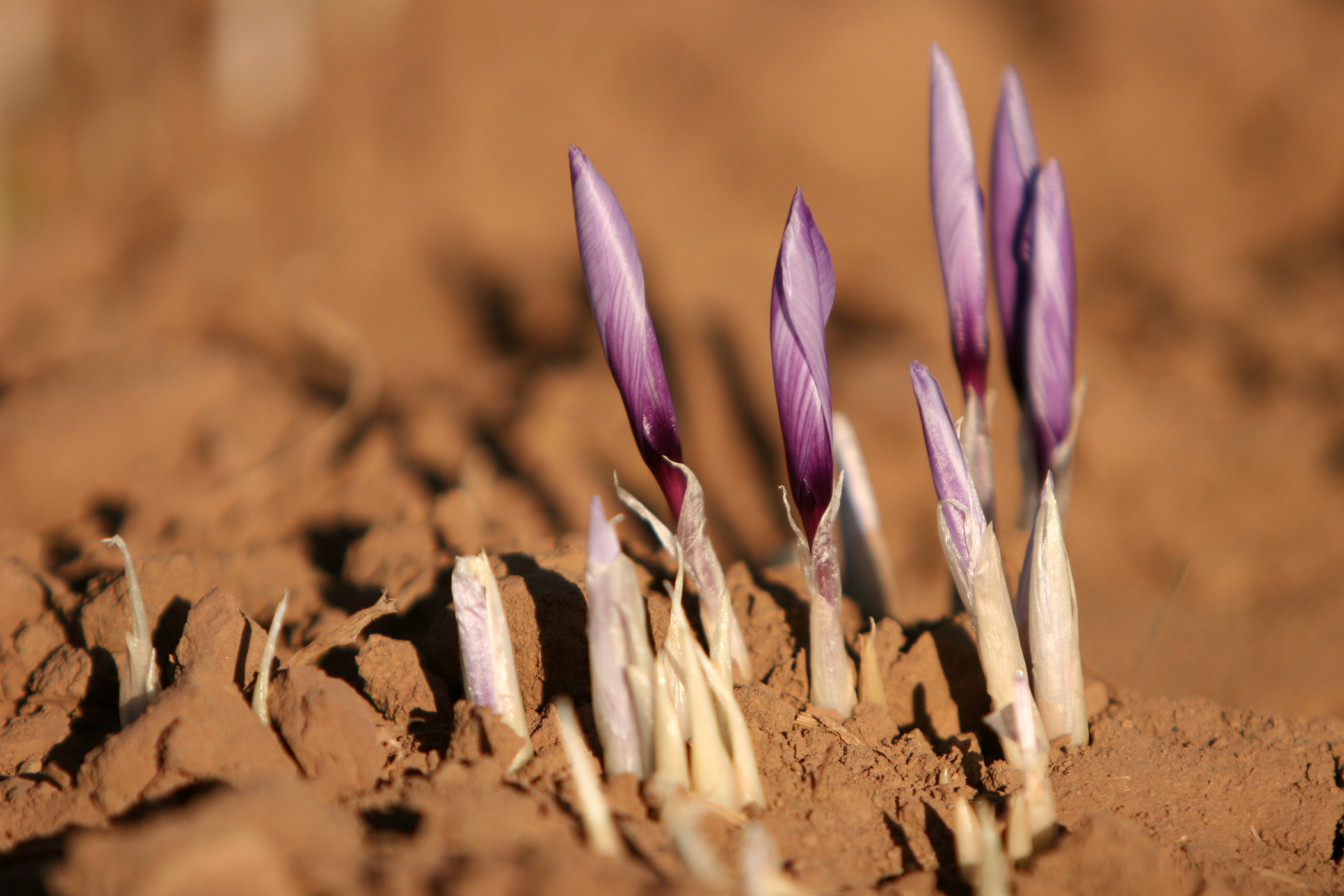
Crocus flowers, early bloom

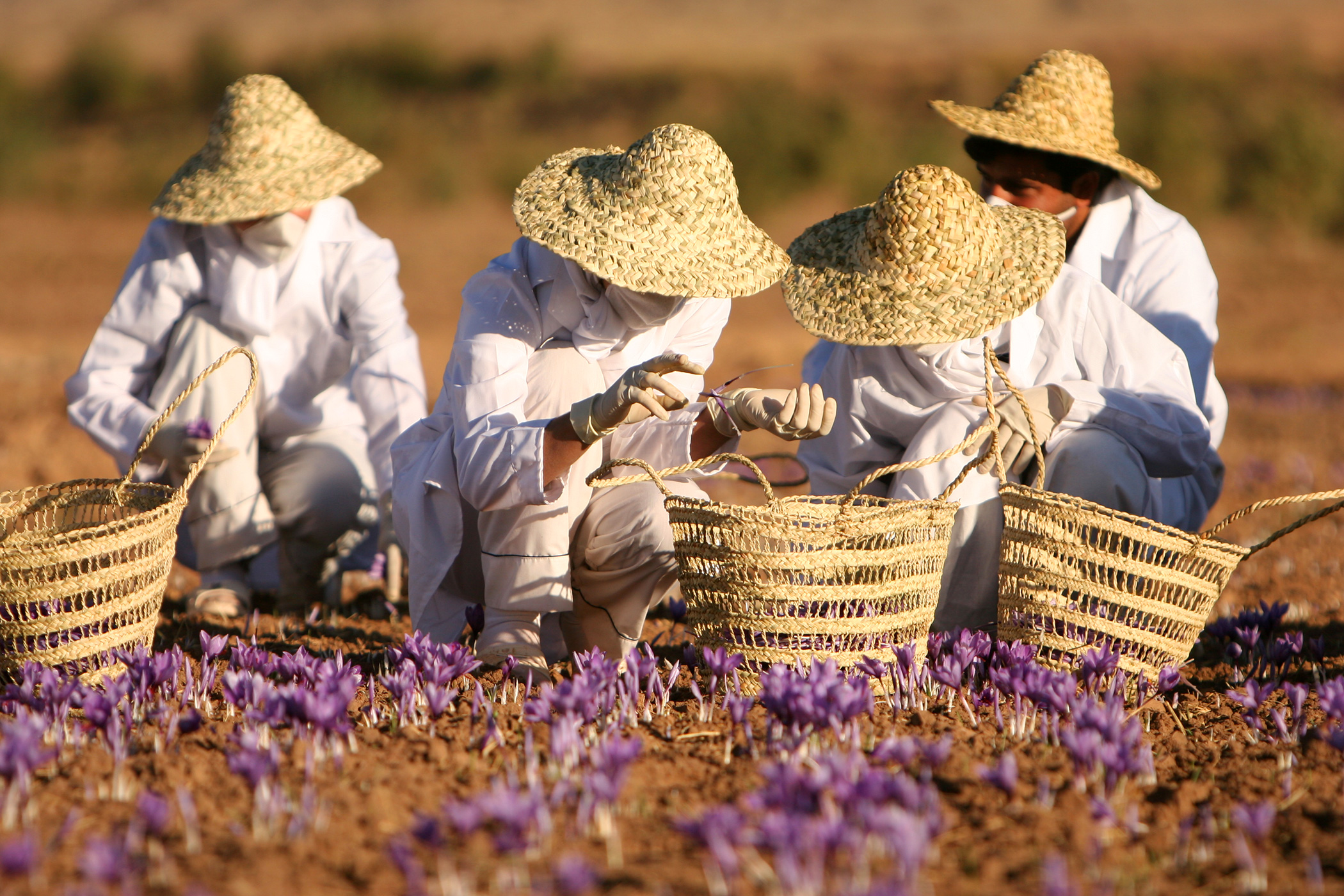
Crocus farming

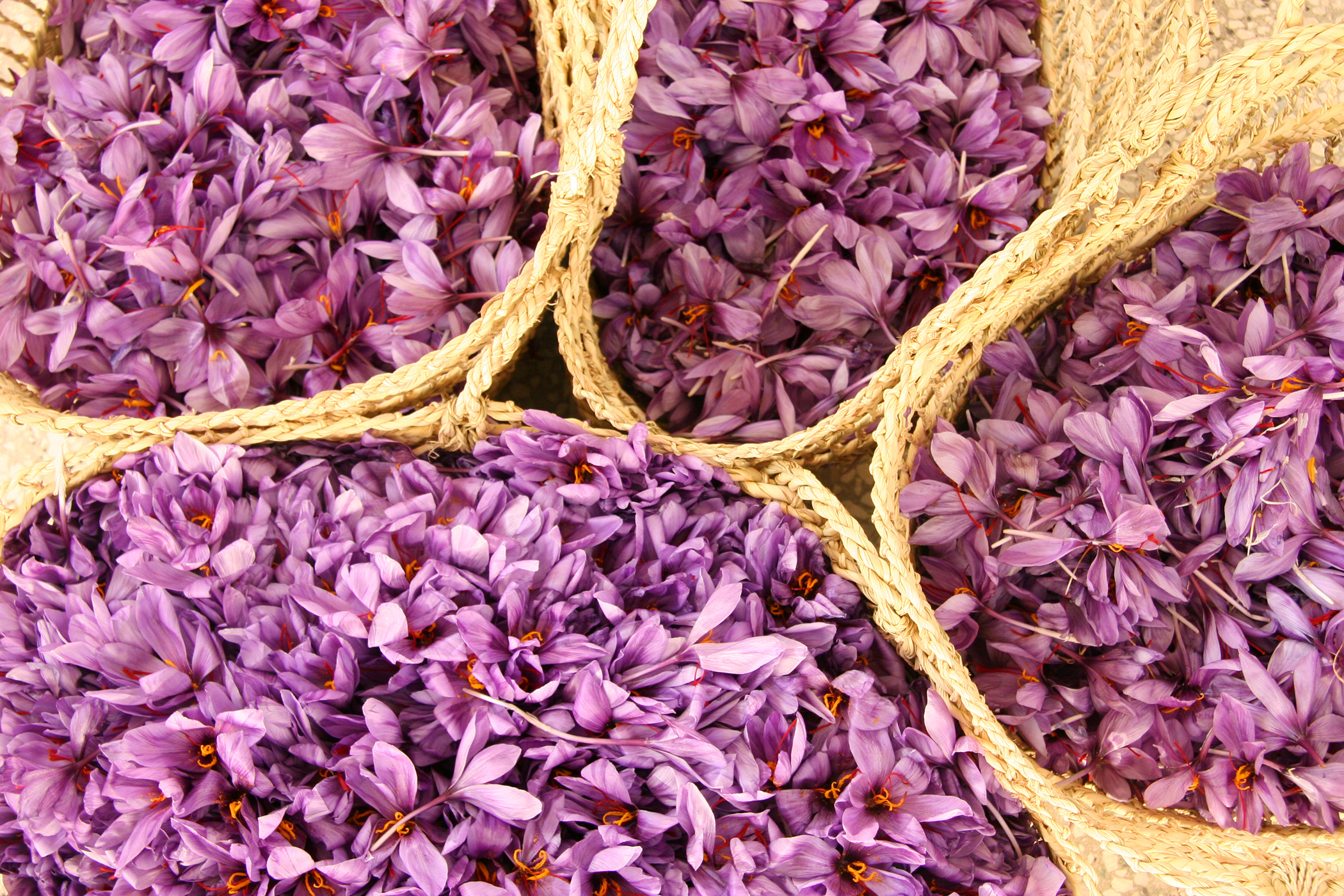
Saffron Flowers, Torbat-e Heydarieh

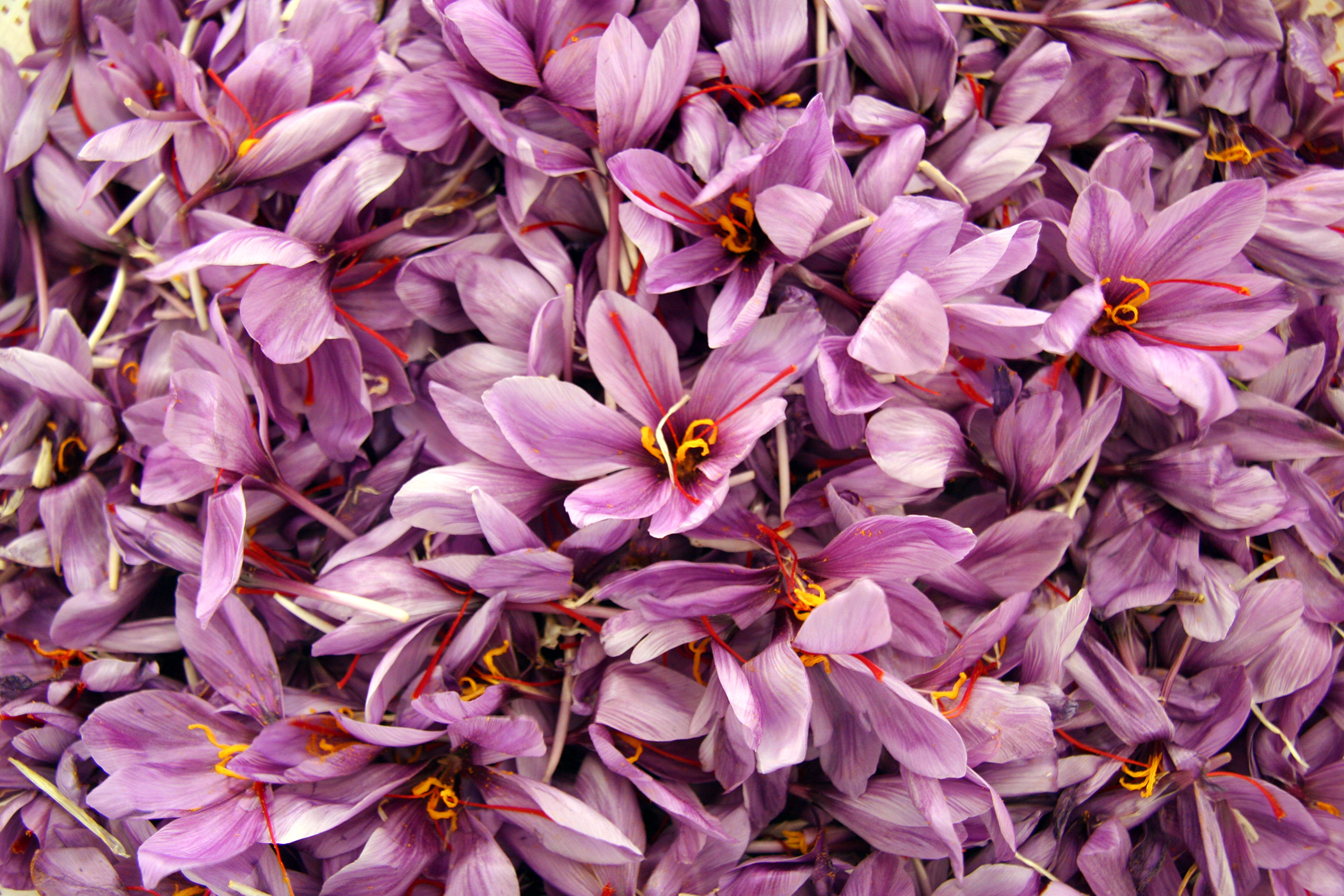
Saffron Flowers, Torbat-e Heydarieh

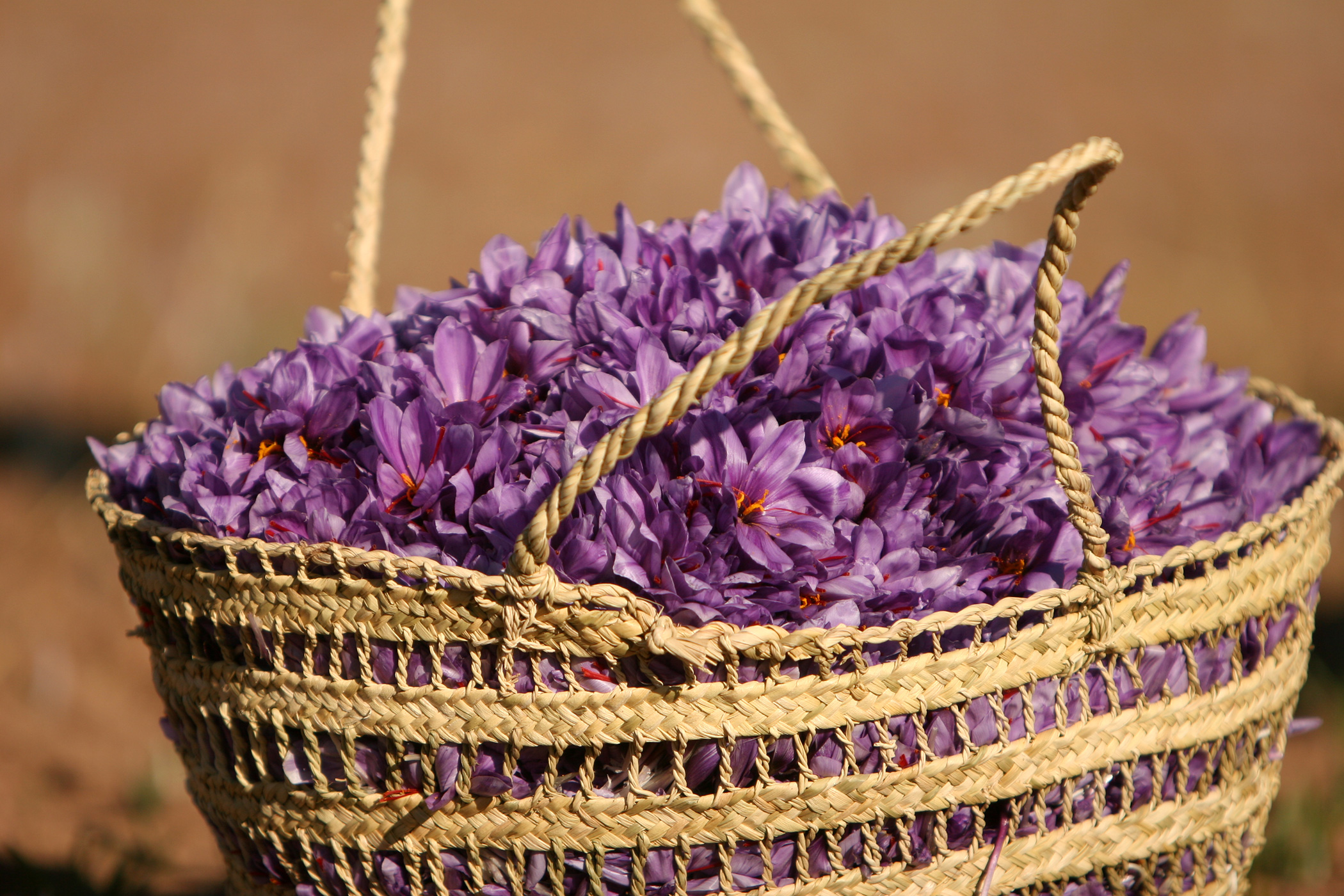
Saffron Flowers

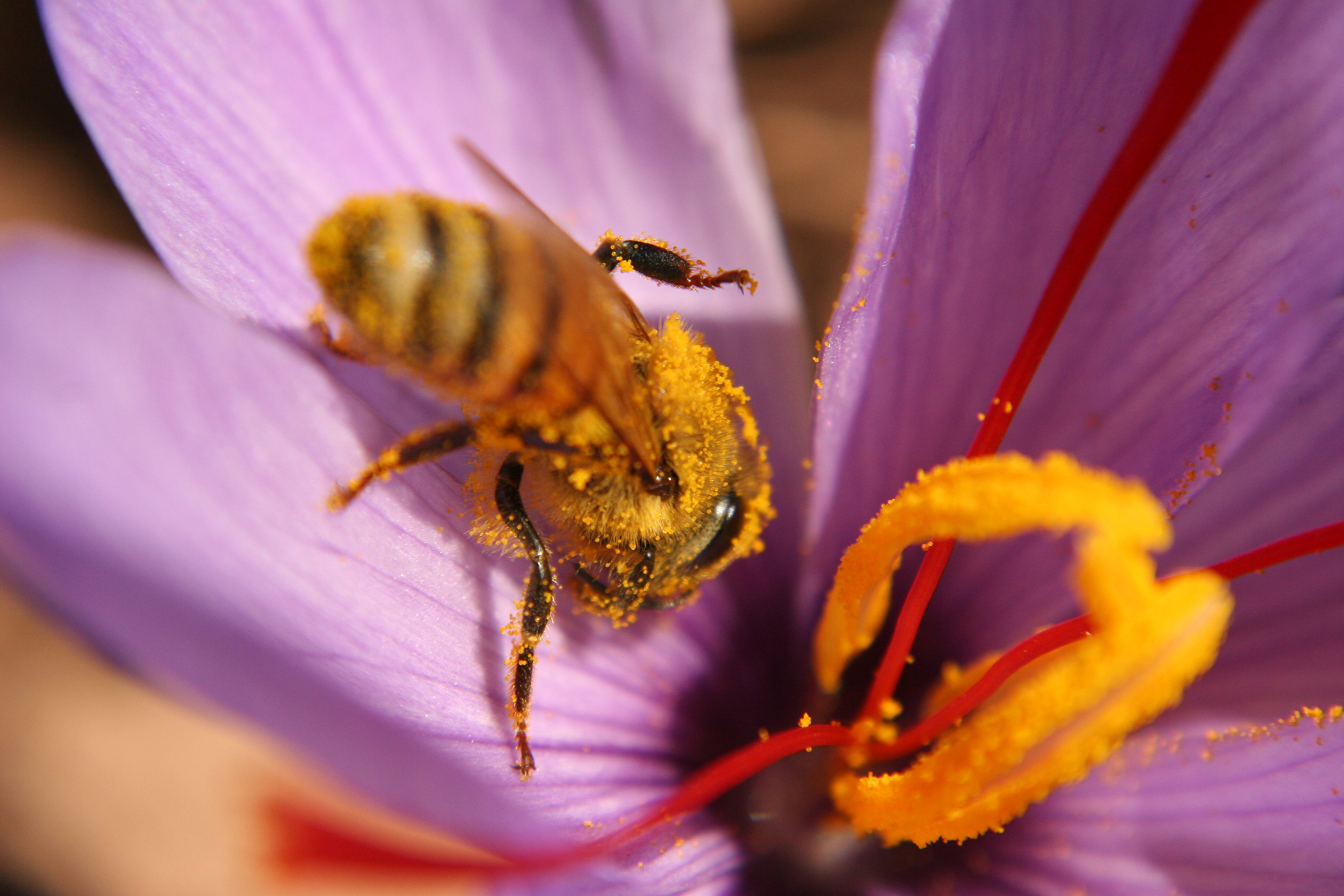
Saffron Honey

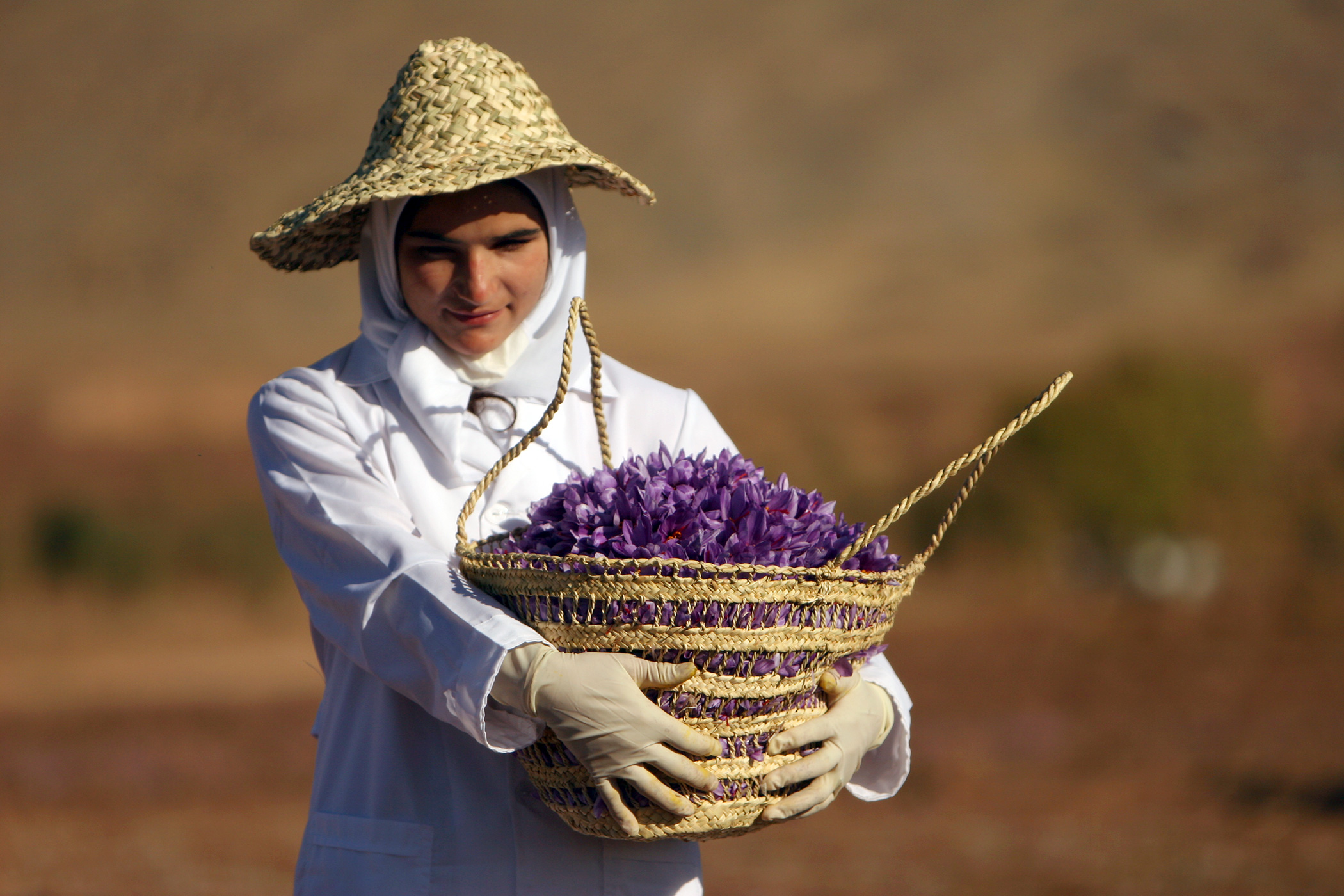
Saffron Farm, Harvest time

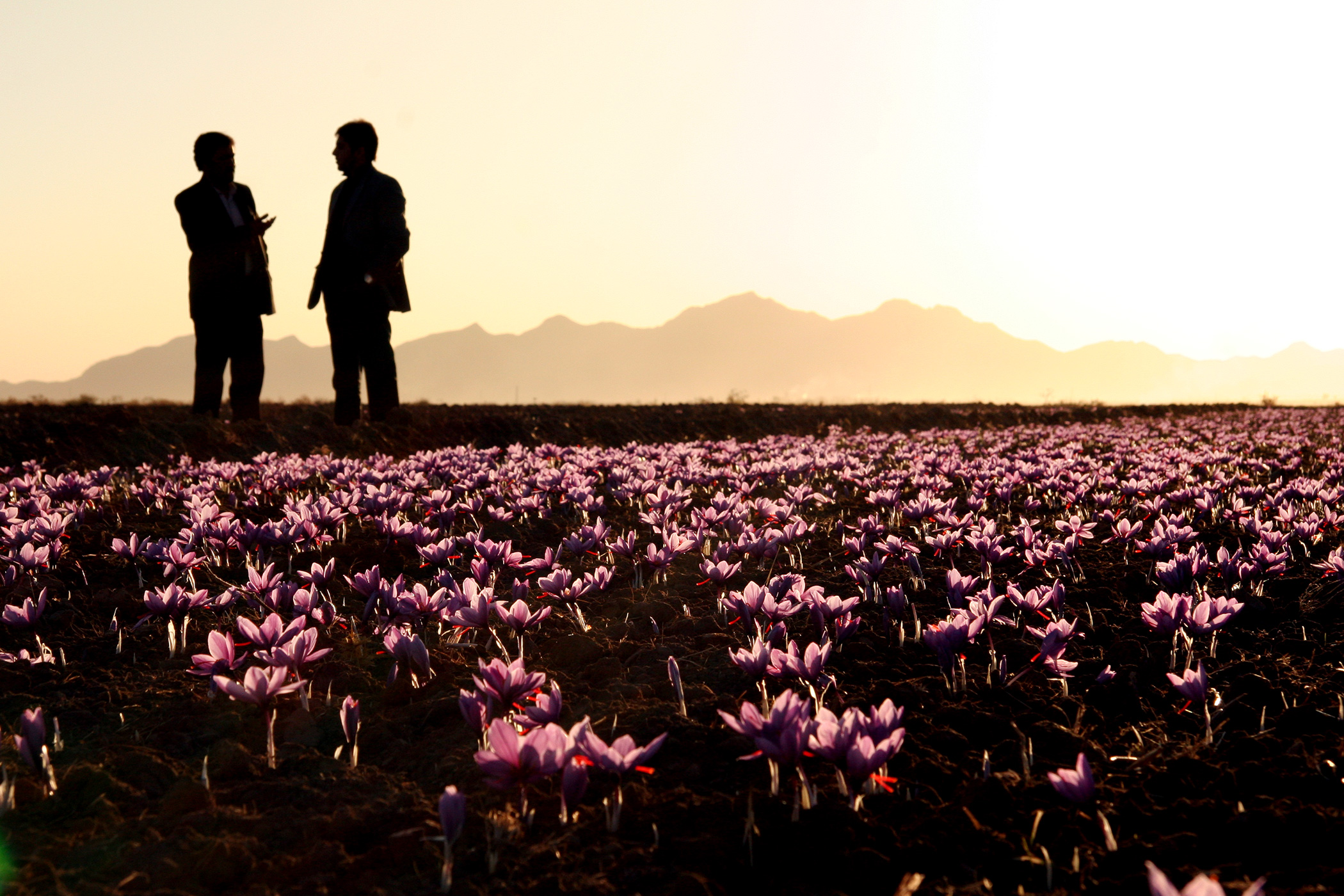
Saffron Flowers, Torbat-e Heydarieh

== Bibliography ==
- Abdullaev FI (January 2002). "Cancer Chemopreventive and Tumoricidal Properties of Saffron (Crocus sativus L.)". Experimental Biology and Medicine. 227 (1): 20–25. Bibcode:2002ExpBM.227...20A. doi:10.1177/153537020222700104. PMID 11788779.
- Celsus AC (1989), De Medicina, Loeb Classical Library, vol. L292, translated by Spencer WG, Harvard University Press, ISBN 978-0-674-99322-8
- Dalby A (2002), Dangerous Tastes: The Story of Spices (1st ed.), University of California Press, ISBN 978-0-520-23674-5
- Dalby A (2003), Food in the Ancient World from A to Z, Routledge, ISBN 978-0-415-23259-3
- Dharmananda S (2005), "Saffron: An Anti-Depressant Herb", Institute for Traditional Medicine, archived from the original on 26 September 2006
- Deo B (2003), "Growing Saffron—The World's Most Expensive Spice" (PDF), Crop and Food Research, no. 20, New Zealand Institute for Crop and Food Research, archived from the original (PDF) on 27 December 2005
- Ferrence SC, Bendersky G (2004), "Therapy with Saffron and the Goddess at Thera", Perspectives in Biology and Medicine, vol. 47, no. 2, pp. 199–226, doi:10.1353/pbm.2004.0026, PMID 15259204
- Finlay V (2003), Colour: A Natural History of the Palette, Random House, ISBN 978-0-8129-7142-2
- Fletcher N (2005), Charlemagne's Tablecloth: A Piquant History of Feasting (1st ed.), Saint Martin's Press, ISBN 978-0-312-34068-1
- Francis S (2011), Saffron: The Story of England's Red Gold, With Delicious Saffron Recipes that Family and Friends will Love, Norfolk Saffron, ISBN 978-0-9550466-7-4
- Grigg DB (1974), The Agricultural Systems of the World (1st ed.), Cambridge University Press, ISBN 978-0-521-09843-4
- Grilli Caiola M (2003), "Saffron Reproductive Biology", Acta Horticulturae, 650 (650), ISHS: 25–37, doi:10.17660/ActaHortic.2004.650.1
- Hanelt P, ed. (2001), Mansfeld's Encyclopedia of Agricultural and Horticultural Crops (1st ed.), Springer, ISBN 978-3-540-41017-1
- Hayes AW (2001), Principles and Methods of Toxicology (4th ed.), Taylor and Francis, ISBN 978-1-56032-814-8
- Hill T (2004), The Contemporary Encyclopedia of Herbs and Spices: Seasonings for the Global Kitchen (1st ed.), Wiley, ISBN 978-0-471-21423-6
- Humphries J (1998), The Essential Saffron Companion, Ten Speed Press, ISBN 978-1-58008-024-8
- Kafi M, Koocheki A, Rashed MH, Nassiri M, eds. (2006), Saffron (Crocus sativus) Production and Processing (1st ed.), Science Publishers, ISBN 978-1-57808-427-2
- Leffingwell JC, "Saffron", leffingwell.com
- McGee H (2004), On Food and Cooking: The Science and Lore of the Kitchen, Scribner, ISBN 978-0-684-80001-1
- Negbi M, ed. (1999), Saffron: Crocus sativus L., CRC Press, ISBN 978-90-5702-394-1
- Rau SR (1969), The Cooking of India, Foods of the World, Time-Life Books, ISBN 978-0-8094-0069-0
- Roden C (2012). The Food of Spain: A Celebration. London: Michael Joseph. ISBN 978-0-718-15719-7.
- Rubio-Moraga A, Castillo-López R, Gómez-Gómez L, et al. (2009), "Saffron Is a Monomorphic Species as Revealed by RAPD, ISSR, and Microsatellite Analyses", BMC Research Notes, vol. 2, doi:10.1186/1756-0500-2-189, PMC 2758891, PMID 19772674
- Russo E, Dreher MC, Mathre ML (2003), Women and Cannabis: Medicine, Science, and Sociology (1st ed.), Psychology Press, ISBN 978-0-7890-2101-4
- Sharaf-Eldin M, Elkholy S, Fernández JA, et al. (August 2008), "Bacillus subtilis FZB24 affects flower quantity and quality of saffron (Crocus sativus)", Planta Medica, 74 (10): 1316–20, Bibcode:2008PlMed..74.1316S, doi:10.1055/s-2008-1081293, PMC 3947403, PMID 18622904
- Verma RS, Middha D (2010), "Analysis of Saffron (Crocus sativus L. Stigma) Components by LC–MS–MS", Chromatographia, 71 (1–2): 117–123, doi:10.1365/S10337-009-1398-Z
- Willard P (2002), Secrets of Saffron: The Vagabond Life of the World's Most Seductive Spice, Beacon Press, ISBN 978-0-8070-5009-5
