= Limibacter =

Scientific classification
- Domain: Bacteria
- Kingdom: Pseudomonadati
- Phylum: Bacteroidota
- Class: Cytophagia
- Order: Cytophagales
- Family: Flammeovirgaceae
- Genus: Limibacter; Yoon et al. 2008

Species
- L. armeniacum

Genus of bacteria

Limibacter is a genus of bacteria from the family Flammeovirgaceae with one known species (Limibacter armeniacum).
