= Algivirga =

Scientific classification
- Domain: Bacteria
- Kingdom: Pseudomonadati
- Phylum: Bacteroidota
- Class: Cytophagia
- Order: Cytophagales
- Family: Flammeovirgaceae
- Genus: Algivirga; Kim et al. 2013

Species
- "A. pacifica"

Genus of bacteria

"Algivirga" is a genus of gram-negative bacteria from the family of Flammeovirgaceae, with one known species ("Algivirga pacifica").
