= Perexilibacter =

Scientific classification
- Domain: Bacteria
- Kingdom: Pseudomonadati
- Phylum: Bacteroidota
- Class: Cytophagia
- Order: Cytophagales
- Family: Flammeovirgaceae
- Genus: Perexilibacter; Yoon et al. 2007

Type species
- Perexilibacter aurantiacus

Species
- P. aurantiacus

Genus of bacteria

Perexilibacter is a genus of bacteria from the family Flammeovirgaceae with one known species (Perexilibacter aurantiacus).
