= Safranal =

Chemical compound

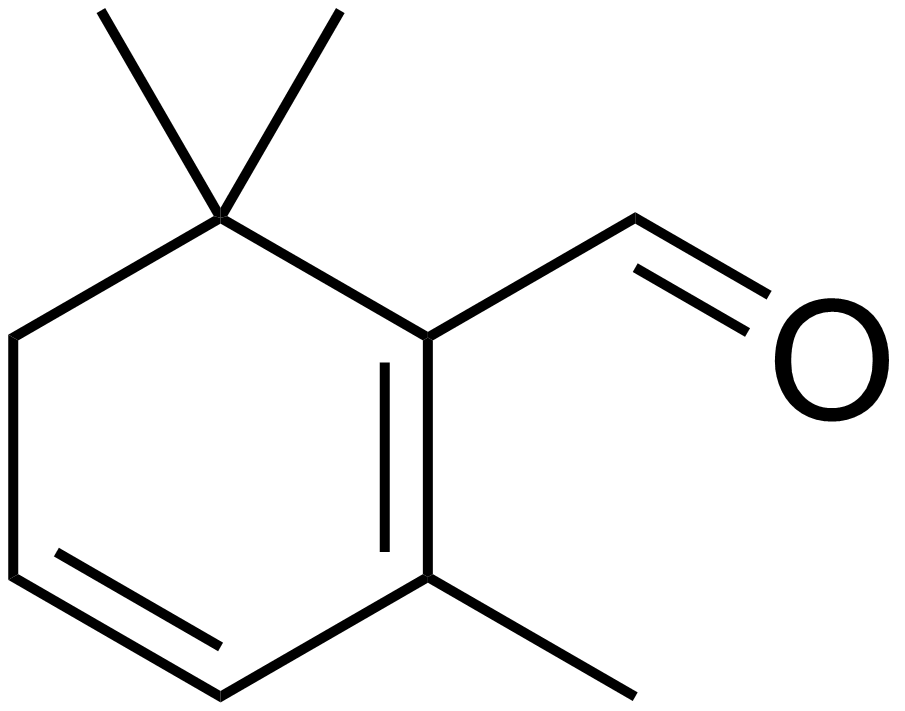
- Safranal

Names
- Preferred IUPAC name 2,6,6-Trimethylcyclohexa-1,3-diene-1-carbaldehyde

Identifiers
CAS Number	116-26-7
3D model (JSmol)	Interactive image
ChEBI	CHEBI:53169
ChemSpider	55000
ECHA InfoCard	100.003.758
PubChem CID	61041
UNII	4393FR07EA
CompTox Dashboard (EPA)	DTXSID7049398
- InChI: InChI=1S/C10H14O/c1-8-5-4-6-10(2,3)9(8)7-11/h4-5,7H,6H2,1-3H3 Key: SGAWOGXMMPSZPB-UHFFFAOYSA-N
- SMILES: O=C\C1=C(\C=C/CC1(C)C)C

Properties
Chemical formula	C_{10}H_{14}O
Molar mass	150.221 g·mol^{−1}
Density	0.9734 g/cm^{3}
Boiling point	70 °C (158 °F; 343 K) at 1 mmHg
- Except where otherwise noted, data are given for materials in their standard state (at 25 °C [77 °F], 100 kPa). verify (what is ?) Infobox references

Safranal is an organic compound isolated from saffron, the spice consisting of the stigmas of crocus flowers (Crocus sativus). It is the constituent primarily responsible for the aroma of saffron.

It is believed that safranal is a degradation product of the carotenoid zeaxanthin via the intermediate picrocrocin.

== Pharmacology ==
Safranal is an effective anticonvulsant in animal models, shown to act as an agonist at GABA_{A} receptors. Safranal also exhibits high antioxidant activity, along with cytotoxicity towards cancer cells in vitro. One of its anticancer mechanisms of action involves disruption of the normal assembly dynamics of cellular microtubules. It has also been shown to have antidepressant properties in animals and pilot studies in humans.

== Natural sources ==
Natural sources of safranal include:

- Microcystis (cyanobacterium)
- Aspalathus linearis (rooibos)
- Camellia sinensis (tea leaf)
- Crocus sativus (saffron)
- Ficus carica (fig leaf)
- Lycium chinense (wolfberry)
- Cuminum cyminum (cumin seed)
- Centaurea sibthorpii
- Centaurea amanicola
- Centaurea consanguinea
- Erodium cicutarium (common stork's-bill or pinweed)
- Calycopteris floribunda (ukshi)
- Sambucus nigra (elderberry)
- Citrus limon (lemon)
- Achillea distans
