= Tunicatimonas =

Scientific classification
- Domain: Bacteria
- Kingdom: Pseudomonadati
- Phylum: Bacteroidota
- Class: Cytophagia
- Order: Cytophagales
- Family: Flammeovirgaceae
- Genus: Tunicatimonas; Yoon et al. 2012

Species
- T. pelagia

Genus of bacteria

Tunicatimonas is a genus from the family of Flammeovirgaceae with one known species (Tunicatimonas pelagia).
