= Xanthovirga =

Scientific classification
- Domain: Bacteria
- Kingdom: Pseudomonadati
- Phylum: Bacteroidota
- Class: Cytophagia
- Order: Cytophagales
- Family: Flammeovirgaceae
- Genus: Xanthovirga; Goldberg et al. 2020

Type species
- Xanthovirga aplysinae

Species
- X. aplysinae

Genus of bacteria

Xanthovirga is a genus from the family of Flammeovirgaceae with one known species (Xanthovirga aplysinae). Xanthovirga aplysinae has been isolated from the sponge Aplysina fistularis from the coast of San Salvador.
