= Flammeovirga =

Scientific classification
- Domain: Bacteria
- Kingdom: Pseudomonadati
- Phylum: Bacteroidota
- Class: Cytophagia
- Order: Cytophagales
- Family: Flammeovirgaceae
- Genus: Flammeovirga; Nakagawa et al. 1997

Species
- F. agarivorans F. aprica F. arenaria F. kamogawensis F. pacifica F. pectinis F. yaeyamensis

Genus of bacteria

Flammeovirga is a Gram-negative, aerobic, non-spore-forming and chemoorganotrophic genus of bacteria in the family Flammeovirgaceae which occur in marine environments.
