= Rapidithrix =

Scientific classification
- Domain: Bacteria
- Kingdom: Pseudomonadati
- Phylum: Bacteroidota
- Class: Cytophagia
- Order: Cytophagales
- Family: Flammeovirgaceae
- Genus: Rapidithrix; Srisukchayakul et al. 2007

Species
- R. thailandica

Synonyms
- Rapidiothrix

Genus of bacteria

Rapidiothrix is a genus from the family of Flammeovirgaceae with one known species (Rapidithrix thailandica). Rapidiothrix bacteria produces the antibiotics ariakemicin A and ariakemicin B.
