= Picrocrocin =

- Picrocrocin

Names
- IUPAC name (4R)-4-(β-D-Glucopyranosyloxy)-2,6,6-trimethylcyclohex-1-ene-1-carbaldehyde
- Systematic IUPAC name (4R)-2,6,6-Trimethyl-4-{[(2R,3R,4S,5S,6R)-3,4,5-trihydroxy-6-(hydroxymethyl)oxan-2-yl]oxy}cyclohex-1-ene-1-carbaldehyde

Identifiers
CAS Number	138-55-6
3D model (JSmol)	Interactive image
ChemSpider	115678
PubChem CID	130796
UNII	ON5B022511
CompTox Dashboard (EPA)	DTXSID40160450
- InChI: InChI=1S/C16H26O7/c1-8-4-9(5-16(2,3)10(8)6-17)22-15-14(21)13(20)12(19)11(7-18)23-15/h6,9,11-15,18-21H,4-5,7H2,1-3H3/t9-,11-,12-,13+,14-,15-/m1/s1 Key: WMHJCSAICLADIN-WYWSWGBSSA-N; InChI=1/C16H26O7/c1-8-4-9(5-16(2,3)10(8)6-17)22-15-14(21)13(20)12(19)11(7-18)23-15/h6,9,11-15,18-21H,4-5,7H2,1-3H3/t9-,11-,12-,13+,14-,15-/m1/s1 Key: WMHJCSAICLADIN-WYWSWGBSBU
- SMILES: O=C\C2=C(/C)C[C@@H](O[C@@H]1O[C@@H]([C@@H](O)[C@H](O)[C@H]1O)CO)CC2(C)C

Properties
Chemical formula	C_{16}H_{26}O_{7}
Molar mass	330.377 g·mol^{−1}
Density	1.31 g/mL
Melting point	154 to 156 °C (309 to 313 °F; 427 to 429 K)
Boiling point	520.4 °C (968.7 °F; 793.5 K)
- Except where otherwise noted, data are given for materials in their standard state (at 25 °C [77 °F], 100 kPa). verify (what is ?) Infobox references

Picrocrocin is a monoterpene glycoside precursor of safranal. It is found in the spice saffron, which comes from the crocus flower. Picrocrocin has a bitter taste, and is the chemical most responsible for the taste of saffron.

During the drying process, picrocrocin liberates the aglycone (HTCC, C_{10}H_{16}O_{2}) due to the action of the enzyme glucosidase. The aglycone is then transformed to safranal by dehydration. Picrocrocin is a degradation product of the carotenoid zeaxanthin.
