= Imperialibacter =

Scientific classification
- Domain: Bacteria
- Kingdom: Pseudomonadati
- Phylum: Bacteroidota
- Class: Cytophagia
- Order: Cytophagales
- Family: Flammeovirgaceae
- Genus: Imperialibacter; Wang et al. 2013

Type species
- Imperialibacter roseus

Species
- I. roseus

Genus of bacteria

Imperialibacter is a genus from the family of Flammeovirgaceae with one known species (Imperialibacter roseus).
