= Zeaxanthin =

Chemical compound

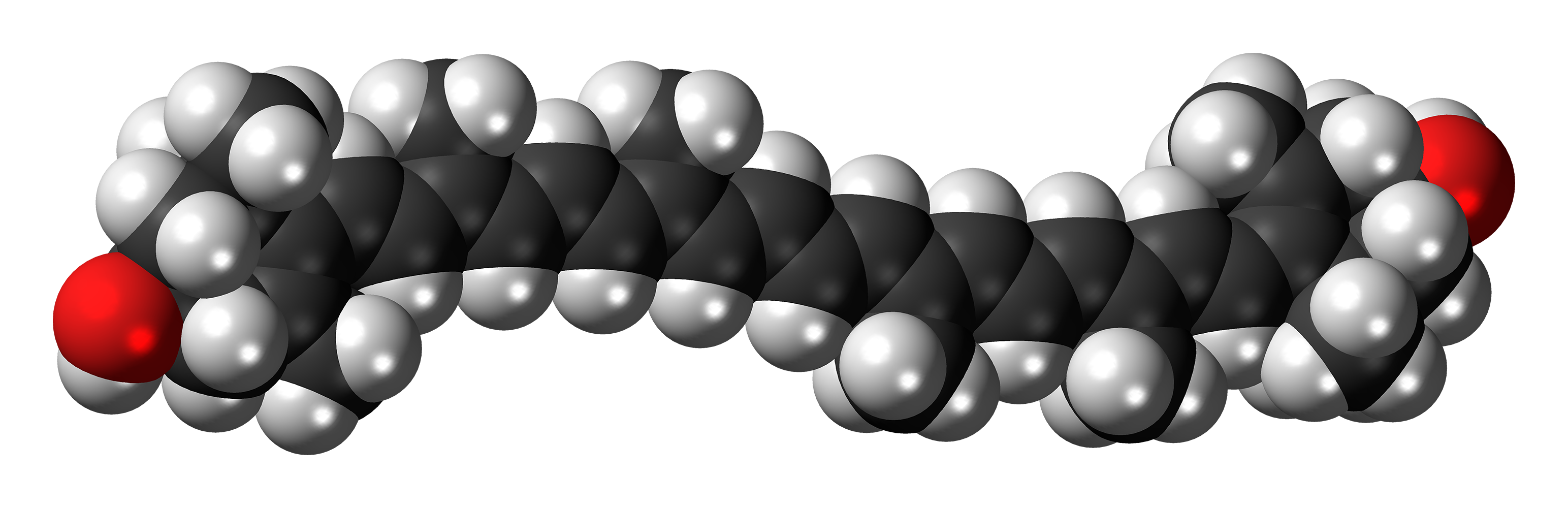

Names
- IUPAC name (3R,3′R)-β,β-Carotene-3,3′-diol
- Systematic IUPAC name (1R,1′R)-4,4′-[(1E,3E,5E,7E,9E,11E,13E,15E,17E)-3,7,12,16-Tetramethyloctadeca-1,3,5,7,9,11,13,15,17-nonaene-1,18-diyl]bis(3,5,5-trimethylcyclohex-3-en-1-ol)

Identifiers
CAS Number	144-68-3
3D model (JSmol)	Interactive image
ChEBI	CHEBI:27547
ChemSpider	4444421
ECHA InfoCard	100.005.125
E number	E161h (colours)
PubChem CID	5280899
UNII	CV0IB81ORO
CompTox Dashboard (EPA)	DTXSID5046807
- InChI: InChI=1S/C40H56O2/c1-29(17-13-19-31(3)21-23-37-33(5)25-35(41)27-39(37,7)8)15-11-12-16-30(2)18-14-20-32(4)22-24-38-34(6)26-36(42)28-40(38,9)10/h11-24,35-36,41-42H,25-28H2,1-10H3/b12-11+,17-13+,18-14+,23-21+,24-22+,29-15+,30-16+,31-19+,32-20+/t35-,36-/m1/s1 Key: JKQXZKUSFCKOGQ-QAYBQHTQSA-N; InChI=1/C40H56O2/c1-29(17-13-19-31(3)21-23-37-33(5)25-35(41)27-39(37,7)8)15-11-12-16-30(2)18-14-20-32(4)22-24-38-34(6)26-36(42)28-40(38,9)10/h11-24,35-36,41-42H,25-28H2,1-10H3/b12-11+,17-13+,18-14+,23-21+,24-22+,29-15+,30-16+,31-19+,32-20+/t35-,36-/m1/s1 Key: JKQXZKUSFCKOGQ-QAYBQHTQBL
- SMILES: CC1=C(C(C[C@@H](C1)O)(C)C)/C=C/C(=C/C=C/C(=C/C=C/C=C(/C=C/C=C(/C=C/C2=C(C[C@H](CC2(C)C)O)C)\C)\C)/C)/C

Properties
Chemical formula	C_{40}H_{56}O_{2}
Molar mass	568.88 g/mol
Appearance	orange-red
Melting point	215.5 °C (419.9 °F; 488.6 K)
Solubility in water	insol.

Related compounds
Related compounds	lutein xanthophyll
- Except where otherwise noted, data are given for materials in their standard state (at 25 °C [77 °F], 100 kPa). verify (what is ?) Infobox references

Zeaxanthin is one of the most common carotenoids in nature, and is used in the xanthophyll cycle. Synthesized in plants and some micro-organisms, it is the pigment that gives paprika (made from red sweet peppers), corn, saffron, goji (wolfberries), and many other plants and microbes their characteristic color.

The name (pronounced zee-uh-zan'-thin) is derived from Zea mays (common yellow maize corn, in which zeaxanthin provides the primary yellow pigment), plus xanthos, the Greek word for "yellow" (see xanthophyll).

Xanthophylls such as zeaxanthin are found in highest quantity in the leaves of most green plants, where they act to modulate light energy and perhaps serve as a non-photochemical quenching agent to deal with triplet chlorophyll (an excited form of chlorophyll) which is overproduced at high light levels during photosynthesis. Zeaxanthin in guard cells acts as a blue light photoreceptor which mediates the stomatal opening.

Animals derive zeaxanthin from a plant diet. Zeaxanthin is one of the two primary xanthophyll carotenoids contained within the retina of the eye. Zeaxanthin supplements are typically taken on the supposition of supporting eye health. Although there are no reported side effects from taking zeaxanthin supplements, the actual health effects of zeaxanthin and lutein are not proven, and, as of 2018, there is no regulatory approval in the European Union or the United States for health claims about products that contain zeaxanthin.

As a food additive, zeaxanthin is a food dye with E number E161h.

== Isomers and macular uptake ==
Lutein and zeaxanthin have identical chemical formulas and are isomers, but they are not stereoisomers. The only difference between them is in the location of the double bond in one of the end rings. This difference gives lutein three chiral centers whereas zeaxanthin has two. Because of symmetry, the (3R,3′S) and (3S,3′R) stereoisomers of zeaxanthin are identical. Therefore, zeaxanthin has only three stereoisomeric forms. The (3R,3′S) stereoisomer is called meso-zeaxanthin.

The principal natural form of zeaxanthin is (3R,3′R)-zeaxanthin. The macula mainly contains the (3R,3′R)- and meso-zeaxanthin forms, but it also contains much smaller amounts of the third (3S,3′S) form. Evidence exists that a specific zeaxanthin-binding protein recruits circulating zeaxanthin and lutein for uptake within the macula.

Due to the commercial value of carotenoids, their biosynthesis has been studied extensively in both natural products and non-natural (heterologous) systems such as the bacteria Escherichia coli and yeast Saccharomyces cerevisiae. Zeaxanthin biosynthesis proceeds from beta-carotene via the action of a single protein, known as a beta-carotene hydroxylase, that is able to add a hydroxyl group (-OH) to carbon 3 and 3′ of the beta-carotene molecule. Zeaxanthin biosynthesis therefore proceeds from beta-carotene to zeaxanthin (a di-hydroxylated product) via beta-cryptoxanthin (the mono hydroxylated intermediate). Although functionally identical, several distinct beta-carotene hydroxylase proteins are known.

Due to the nature of zeaxanthin, relative to astaxanthin (a carotenoid of significant commercial value) beta-carotene hydroxylase proteins have been studied extensively.

== Relationship with diseases of the eye ==
Several observational studies have provided preliminary evidence for high dietary intake of foods including lutein and zeaxanthin with lower incidence of age-related macular degeneration (AMD), most notably the Age-Related Eye Disease Study (AREDS2). Because foods high in one of these carotenoids tend to be high in the other, research does not separate effects of one from the other.

- Three subsequent meta-analyses of dietary lutein and zeaxanthin concluded that these carotenoids lower the risk of progression from early stage AMD to late stage AMD.
- A 2023 (updated) Cochrane review of 26 studies from several countries, however, concluded that dietary supplements containing zeaxanthin and lutein have little to no influence on the progression of AMD. In general, there remains insufficient evidence to assess the effectiveness of dietary or supplemental zeaxanthin or lutein in treatment or prevention of early AMD.

As for cataracts, two meta-analyses confirm a correlation between high serum concentrations of lutein and zeaxanthin and a decrease in the risk of nuclear cataract, but not cortical or subcapsular cataract. The reports did not separate a zeaxanthin effect from a lutein effect. The AREDS2 trial enrolled subjects at risk for progression to advanced age-related macular degeneration. Overall, the group getting lutein (10 mg) and zeaxanthin (2 mg) did not reduce the need for cataract surgery. Any benefit is more likely to be apparent in subpopulations of individuals exposed to high oxidative stress, such as heavy smokers, alcoholics or those with low dietary intake of carotenoid-rich foods.

In 2005, the US Food and Drug Administration rejected a Qualified Health Claims application by Xangold, citing insufficient evidence supporting the use of a lutein- and zeaxanthin-containing supplement in prevention of AMD. Dietary supplement companies in the U.S. are allowed to sell lutein and lutein plus zeaxanthin products using dietary supplement, such as "Helps maintain eye health", as long as the FDA disclaimer statement ("These statements have not been evaluated...") is on the label. In Europe, as recently as 2014, the European Food Safety Authority reviewed and rejected claims that lutein or lutein plus zeaxanthin improved vision.

== Natural occurrence ==
Zeaxanthin is the pigment that gives paprika, corn, saffron, wolfberries (goji), and many other plants their characteristic colors of red, orange or yellow. Spirulina is also a rich source and can serve as a dietary supplement. Zeaxanthin breaks down to form picrocrocin and safranal, which are responsible for the taste and aroma of saffron.

Dark green leaf vegetables, such as kale, spinach, turnip greens, collard greens, romaine lettuce, watercress, Swiss chard and mustard greens are rich in lutein but contain little to no zeaxanthin, with the exception of scallions cooked in oil. Orange bell peppers (but not green, red, or yellow) are rich in zeaxanthin.

Lutein and zeaxanthin concentrations in fruits and vegetables (μg / 100 g)
Food (100 g)	Lutein trans (μg)	Zeaxanthin trans (μg)
Spinach, cooked	12,640	0
Spinach, raw	6,603	0
Kale, cooked	8,884	0
Cilantro	7,703	0
Scallions, cooked in oil		2,488
Scallions, raw	782	0
Bell pepper, green	173	0
Bell pepper, orange	208	1,665
Bell pepper, red	0	22
Bell pepper, yellow	139	18
Cornmeal, yellow	1	531
Cornmeal, white	13	13
Corn, cooked from frozen	202	202
Tortilla, corn	276	255

== Safety ==
An acceptable daily intake level for zeaxanthin was proposed as 0.75 mg/kg of body weight/day, or 53 mg/day for a 70 kg adult. In humans, an intake of 20 mg/day for up to six months had no adverse effects. As of 2016, neither the U.S. Food and Drug Administration nor the European Food Safety Authority had set a Tolerable Upper Intake Level (UL) for lutein or zeaxanthin.
