= Flammeovirgaceae =

Scientific classification
- Domain: Bacteria
- Kingdom: Pseudomonadati
- Phylum: Bacteroidota
- Class: Cytophagia
- Order: Cytophagales
- Family: Flammeovirgaceae; Yoon et al. 2011

Genera
- "Algivirga" Kim et al. 2013; Flammeovirga Nakagawa et al. 1997; Flexithrix Lewin 1970 (Approved Lists 1980); Imperialibacter Wang et al. 2013; Limibacter Yoon et al. 2008; Perexilibacter Yoon et al. 2007; "Porifericola" Yoon et al. 2011; Rapidithrix Srisukchayakul et al. 2007; Sediminitomix Khan et al. 2007; Tunicatimonas Yoon et al. 2016; Xanthovirga Goldberg et al. 2020

Family of bacteria

Flammeovirgaceae is a family of gram-negative bacteria.
