= Scirpophaga excerptalis =

Scientific classification
- Kingdom: Animalia
- Phylum: Arthropoda
- Class: Insecta
- Order: Lepidoptera
- Family: Crambidae
- Genus: Scirpophaga
- Species: S. excerptalis

Binomial name
- Scirpophaga excerptalis (Walker, 1863)

Synonyms
- Chilo excerptalis Walker, 1863; Scirpophaga monostigma Zeller, 1863; Scirpophaga butyrota Meyrick, 1889; Scirpophaga intacta P.C.T. Snellen, 1890; Topeutis rhodoproctalis Hampson, 1919

Species of moth

Scirpophaga excerptalis, the white top borer or sugarcane top borer, is a moth in the family Crambidae. It was described by Francis Walker in 1863. It is found in southern Asia from the Indian subcontinent in the west to southern China in the east, south to New Guinea, possibly Australia and the Solomon Islands.

== Description ==
The wingspan is 22–28 mm for males and 26–35 mm for females.

=== Similar species ===
Many, if not all, records of the moth Scirpophaga nivella in the cane fields of Asia are in fact of S. excerptalis. All species of Scirpophaga are indistinguishable from each other as caterpillars, very difficult to distinguish as females, and can best be distinguished by examining the male genitalia or by sequencing and comparing the DNA. Chen & Wu find the males resemble S. magnella the most in their key to the genitalia of the genus, with S. tongyaii slightly less similar, and S. khasis and S. adunctella less so. The females are also most similar to S. magnella, and less so to S. adunctella and S. flavidorsalis.

== Distribution ==
It is found in China (including Jiangxi, Hunan, Guangdong, Hainan, Guangxi, Sichuan, Guizhou and Yunnan), Taiwan, Japan, Pakistan, India, Sri Lanka, Nepal, Bhutan, Bangladesh, Thailand, Vietnam, Singapore, Peninsular Malaysia, Indonesia (including Java, Sumba Island, Timor, Buru, Adonara Island, Ambon Island and New Guinea), the Philippines, Papua New Guinea (including New Hannover, New Britain and New Ireland) and the Solomon Islands.

It is not native to Australia. According to Sallam (2003, 2006) it does not occur there and has a high chance of invading the country, however Chen & Wu (2014) include Australia in its distribution.

== Ecology ==
=== Food plants ===
The larvae feed on Saccharum (sugarcane, including Saccharum robustum and Saccharum officinarum) and Triticum species (cultivated wheat).

=== Parasitoids ===
According to Girish Chandra, Tetrastichus, Trichogramma intermedium and T. minutum are egg parasitoids. Goniozus indicus, Stenobracon deesae, Amauromorpha accepta schoenobii, Isotima javensis, Syzeuctus and Sturmiopsis inferens have been found infecting caterpillars. Known parasites of pupae are the species Tetrastichus ayyari and Xanthopimpla pedator.

Isotima javensis is a key general parasitoid of larvae and pupae in India. Another study found Centeterus alternecoloratus to be the by far most important parasitoid of pupae in India, with levels of parasitism from 33–50% depending on study/region; it also occurs in maize fields. Rhaconotus scirpophagae is the most common parasitoid of the caterpillar stage of this moth in the sugarcane fields of Pakistan.

D. K. Butani documented a number of parasitoids of the moth in sugarcane fields in India in the early 1950s, and again in the early 1970s: Brumus suturalis, Telenomus beneficiens, T. saccharicola, Tetrastichus schoenobii and another Tetrastichus species on the eggs; an Anostocetus species, an Aprostocetus species, Campyloneurus mutator, a Chilonis species, Cotesia flavipes, a Cremastus species, Glyptomorpha karnalensis, Goniozus indicus, another Goniozus species, Iphiaulax sikkimenis, another Iphiaulax species, Listrognathus clavinervis, Meganura famulus, Myosoma chinensis, Rhaconotus roslinesis, R. scirpophagae, R. signipennis, a Syzeuctus species, Stenobracon deesae, Sturmiopsis inferens and a Vipio species on the caterpillars; a Monomorium species on both the caterpillars and pupae; Ischnojoppa luteator, Isotima dammermani, I. javensis, Melcha ornatipennis, Tetrastichus ayyari and Xanthopimpla stemmator on the pupae; and Goryphus basilaris, another Goryphus species, a Kriegeria species and a Shirakia species on an unknown stage of life. Stenobracon nicevillei (a possible synonym of S. maculata from Taiwan) was recorded twice by Butani, as well as later in the Punjab.

Telenomus beneficiens var. elongatus has been found to be the most important parasite of the eggs in sugarcane fields in Taiwan, Amauromorpha schoenobii and Exetastes longicornis have been recorded from these same fields since before the 1950s, and Xanthopimpla stemmator has been recorded from here since before 1934. Low levels of parasitism of the caterpillars by an Isotima species in a sugarcane field in Pakistan was reported in a 1962 study. The same study found low levels of parasitism by Stenobracon deesae in Pakistan, <3.1% (also in maize), but in another study in North Bihar, India, up to 54.23% of the caterpillars were infected. In Indonesia Tetrastichus schoenobii infects eggs in sugarcane fields. A Stenobracon species was found to parasitise the caterpillars in cane fields in Lampung, Sumatra, Indonesia. Stenobracon trifasciatus has been recorded a number of times as a parasite of the caterpillars of this species in sugarcane fields in Taiwan and Indonesia.

There are pre-1950s reports from cane fields of Kriegeria heptazonata, Gambroides dammermani, Meganura famulus and Rhaconotus schoenobivorus parasitising an unknown stage of life of the moth in the Philippines, from Myanmar Melcha ornatipennis (unknown), and from India Mesostenus longicornis (unknown) and the generalist parasitoid of pupae Xanthopimpla predator, and from both the Philippines and Indonesia Gambroides javensis (unknown). An Apanteles species has been found to parasitise the caterpillars in cane fields in Central Java, Indonesia, and another perhaps in the Philippines. An Elasmus species has been found on caterpillars in cane fields in Taiwan (1934) and Indonesia (pre-1953). Macrocentrus jacobsoni and Shirakia yokohamensis have been found on caterpillars in cane fields in Taiwan (pre-1953). Two relatively recent studies found Cotesia flavipes as a parasitoid of the caterpillars in respectively the Philippines and Thailand. There is lastly an old report of a Dinarmus species that has possibly been found as a parasite of the caterpillars in Indonesia.

Allorhogas pyralophagus is a Mexican species of parasitoid which has been recorded to attack this moth; it was introduced to India, and later Sumatra in Indonesia, and said to have been established at the release sites in India, although a later study failed to recover it from the cane fields.

== Uses ==
The species is a pest in sugarcane plantations.

=== Damage ===
Caterpillars bore into the midrib of the leaf, leaving red markings and small holes on the leaves. Then it bores further to the upper portion of stem, causing "dead heart" symptoms as the top of the shoot dies off. Gradually, side branches start growing from a lower node, giving a characteristic "bunchy top" appearance to the plant.

=== Control ===
Mechanical control is achieved by destroying crops in the infected part of the field and by collecting and destroying the egg masses.

Chemical control is difficult but possible. Spraying low dosages of malathion, endosulfan or carbofuran during the period the moths lay their eggs has been effective. It has also been recommended to dust crops with moderate concentrations of carbofuran or high concentrations of dieldrin, endrin or lindane during the period the adult moths emerge from their cocoons. Note that this information is very old, most of these products have been banned internationally for agricultural use.

There is no biological control known, but Chandra mentions that there has supposedly been one successful attempt documented by the former Commonwealth Institute of Biological Control (1948–1986, after a number of name changes and integration with CAB International, ceased to exist in 2006) using the mass release of exotic species of Trichogramma egg parasitoids as a control method, however, no Trichogramma species is known to have parasitised this species according to Sallam in his 2006 review of different sugarcane stem borer species and their parasites in Asia and Australia This attempt Chandra mentions most likely refers to an experiment in Taiwan, published 1972, where Trichogramma australicum and T. japonicum were released into a field which may have likely harboured this species.
