= Scirpophaga nivella =

Sugarcane top borer

Scientific classification
- Kingdom: Animalia
- Phylum: Arthropoda
- Clade: Pancrustacea
- Class: Insecta
- Order: Lepidoptera
- Family: Crambidae
- Genus: Scirpophaga
- Species: S. nivella

Binomial name
- Scirpophaga nivella (Fabricius, 1794) Lewvanich, 1981

Synonyms
- Tinea nivella Fabricius, 1794; Tryporyza nivella (Fabricius, 1794) Wang, 1980; Crambus niveus Fabricius, 1798; Scirpophaga chrysorrhoa Zeller, 1863; Scirpophaga auriflua Zeller, 1863; Scirpophaga brunnescens Moore, 1888; Schoenobius celidias Meyrick, 1894; Scirpophaga euclastalis Strand, 1918

Species of moth

Scirpophaga nivella is a moth in the family Crambidae. It was described by Johan Christian Fabricius in 1794. It is found in southern Asia from the Indian subcontinent in the west to southern China in the east, south to New Guinea and Australia, including New Caledonia and Fiji. Some sources have affixed the common name "sugarcane top borer" to it, despite it not being found in sugarcane, because they are confused with the species Scirpophaga excerptalis, which is an actual borer in the tops of sugarcane. Another newer common name that has been invented for these moths is "white rice borer".

== Taxonomy ==
The species was described in 1794 by Johan Christian Fabricius as Tinea nivella, from a specimen collected in India. It was moved to the genus Tryporyza by Wang in 1980, and a year later it was moved again to the genus Scirpophaga by the Thai entomologist Angoon Lewvanich.

The genus Scirpophaga was first introduced by Georg Friedrich Treitschke in 1832 as a monotypic genus; Treitschke gives as etymology for the generic epithet the word Scirpus, a type of plant commonly known as a "rush", and the Ancient Greek word φαγεῖν (transliterated phageîn), which means "to eat".

The holotype is a female specimen from India kept at the Zoologisk Museum in Copenhagen, with the genitalia on a slide numbered 3602.

== Description ==
The wingspan is about 28–30 mm in males and 24–50 mm in females. Hindwings with veins 4 and 5 well separated at origin. A pure white moth with orange anal tuft, sometimes brownish in the female. The larvae are off white with a reddish dorsal line.

=== Similar species ===
Many, if not all, records of the moth Scirpophaga nivella in the cane fields of Asia are in fact of S. excerptalis. All species of Scirpophaga are indistinguishable from each other as caterpillars, very difficult to distinguish as females, and can best be distinguished by examining the male genitalia or by sequencing and comparing the DNA. Specimens of S. nivella were formerly mistakenly identified as S. chrysorrhoa.

Chen & Wu find the males resemble S. xanthopygata the most, and progressively less so to S. praelata and S. humilis. The females can be distinguished from others of the genus by having an antrum with a separate sclerotized tip. They are most similar to S. parvalis and to others within the S. praelata group, which includes all of the species mentioned in this paragraph.

A 2019 study of the DNA found that the species S. innotata, an important pest of rice, is most likely conspecific with this species.

== Distribution ==
According to Chen & Wu it is found in China (including Henan, Shanghai, Jiangsu, Zhejiang, Jiangxi, Fujian, Guangdong, Hainan, Hong Kong, Guangxi, Yunnan), Taiwan, India, Nepal, Bangladesh, Sri Lanka, on the Andaman Islands, Myanmar, Thailand, Vietnam, western Malaysia, Singapore, the Philippines, Indonesia (including Sumatra, Java, Borneo, Timor, Aru Islands), New Guinea, Australia, New Caledonia and Fiji.

Another source has it occurring in much of the same as above, but has it occurring in Pakistan, but not in Australia.

Another source, CAB International, has it in much of the same, but includes both Pakistan and Australia.

In 1981 Lewvanich complies the distribution as including Fiji and New Caledonia.

The distribution in Australia is given by Ian Francis Bell Common in his account of S. chrysorrhoa, which is name he misidentifies this species as.

Because most of the distribution is garnered from misidentified collections made over the past century, of the sources above only Lewvanich can be accepted as trustworthy, and it is unclear where exactly the species occurs.

== Ecology ==
=== Food plants ===
A major food plant is often erroneously believed to be sugarcane. This is due to most records of this moth to actually be of the species Scirpophaga excerptalis. Although this situation was resolved taxonomically by a 1981 publication by Lewvanich, many reports have continued to erroneously misidentify S. excerptalis as S. nivella.

Cyperus, Eleocharis and Scirpus are actually the main host plants of the moth. Oryza sativa (rice) is sometimes affected, but the scarcity of recent reports of this moth infecting rice likely means that it is only a minor pest of rice.

=== Parasitoids ===
The Indian agronomic entomologist Dhamo K. Butani documented a Temelucha species parasitising the moth in rice fields in India.

== Uses ==
The species has historically been considered a potential pest of sugarcane, and often still is, although publications in 1981 and later in 2003 have made clear this species does not attack sugarcane. It may, however, occasionally be found in rice.

=== Damage ===
Caterpillars bore into the midrib of the leaf, leaving red markings and small holes on the leaves. Then it bores further to the upper portion of stem, causing "dead heart" symptoms as the top of the shoot dies off. Gradually, side branches start growing from a lower node, giving a characteristic "bunchy top" appearance to the plant.

=== Control ===
Mechanical control is achieved by destroying crops in the infected part of the field and by collecting and destroying the egg masses.

Chemical control is difficult but possible. Spraying low dosages of malathion, endosulfan or carbofuran during the period the moths lay their eggs has been effective. It has also been recommended to dust crops with moderate concentrations of carbofuran or high concentrations of dieldrin, endrin or lindane during the period the adult moths emerge from their cocoons. Note that this information is very old, most of these products have been banned internationally for agricultural use.
