= C6H6Cl6 =

The molecular formula C_{6}H_{6}Cl_{6} may refer to:

- Hexachlorocyclohexane
  - alpha-Hexachlorocyclohexane
  - beta-Hexachlorocyclohexane
  - gamma-Hexachlorocyclohexane, a.k.a. Lindane, a pesticide
- Polyvinylidene chloride
