= S. nepalensis =

S. nepalensis may refer to:

- Saropogon nepalensis, a robber fly
- Satoblephara nepalensis, a geometer moth
- Saurauia nepalensis, a Chinese gooseberry
- Saussurea nepalensis, a herbaceous plant
- Schizothorax nepalensis, an Asian fish
- Scirpophaga nepalensis, a grass moth
- Scopula nepalensis, a Nepalese moth
- Scutiger nepalensis, an Asian amphibian
- Skorlagad nepalensis, a ground beetle
- Somatochlora nepalensis, a green dragonfly
- Staphylococcus nepalensis, a Gram-positive bacterium
- Stellaria nepalensis, a flowering plant
- Stenolophus nepalensis, a ground beetle
- Stephostethus nepalensis, a minute brown scavenger beetle
- Styringomyia nepalensis, a crane fly
- Sympycnus nepalensis, a long-legged fly
- Synagelides nepalensis, a jumping spider
- Syntomus nepalensis, a ground beetle
