= Diceratops =

Diceratops may refer to:

- Syzeuctus (junior synonym Diceratops Förster, 1869), a genus of hymenopteran insect in the subfamily Banchinae
- Nedoceratops (originally named Diceratops Lull, 1905), a controversial genus of ceratopsid dinosaur
