= Pontibacter lucknowensis =

Scientific classification
- Domain: Bacteria
- Kingdom: Pseudomonadati
- Phylum: Bacteroidota
- Class: Cytophagia
- Order: Cytophagales
- Family: Hymenobacteraceae
- Genus: Pontibacter
- Species: P. lucknowensis

Binomial name
- Pontibacter lucknowensis Dwivedi et al. 2013

Type strain
- CCM 7955, MTCC 11079, DM9

Species of bacterium

Pontibacter lucknowensis is a Gram-negative, rod-shaped, aerobic and motile bacterium from the genus Pontibacter which has been isolated from hexachlorocyclohexane contaminated soil in Lucknow, India.
