= Pontibacter ummariensis =

Scientific classification
- Domain: Bacteria
- Kingdom: Pseudomonadati
- Phylum: Bacteroidota
- Class: Cytophagia
- Order: Cytophagales
- Family: Hymenobacteraceae
- Genus: Pontibacter
- Species: P. ummariensis

Binomial name
- Pontibacter ummariensis Mahato et al. 2016

Type strain
- DSM 100161, KCTC 42944, MCC 2777, NKM1

Species of bacterium

Pontibacter ummariensis is a Gram-negative bacterium from the genus Pontibacter which has been isolated from hexachlorocyclohexane contaminated soil in Lucknow in India.
