= Pontibacter mucosus =

Scientific classification
- Domain: Bacteria
- Kingdom: Pseudomonadati
- Phylum: Bacteroidota
- Class: Cytophagia
- Order: Cytophagales
- Family: Hymenobacteraceae
- Genus: Pontibacter
- Species: P. mucosus

Binomial name
- Pontibacter mucosus Nayyar et al. 2016

Type strain
- DSM 100162, KCTC 42942, PB3

Species of bacterium

Pontibacter mucosus is a halotolerant, Gram-negative and rod-shaped bacterium from the genus Pontibacter which has been isolated from hexachlorocyclohexane-contaminated pond sediments from Chinhat in Lucknow in India.
