= Pontibacter indicus =

Scientific classification
- Domain: Bacteria
- Kingdom: Pseudomonadati
- Phylum: Bacteroidota
- Class: Cytophagia
- Order: Cytophagales
- Family: Hymenobacteraceae
- Genus: Pontibacter
- Species: P. indicus

Binomial name
- Pontibacter indicus Singh et al. 2014

Type strain
- CCM8435, MCC2027, LP100

Species of bacterium

Pontibacter indicus is a bacterium from the genus Pontibacter which has been isolated from soil which was contaminated with hexachlorocyclohexane in Lucknow in India.
