= Pontibacter ramchanderi =

Scientific classification
- Domain: Bacteria
- Kingdom: Pseudomonadati
- Phylum: Bacteroidota
- Class: Cytophagia
- Order: Cytophagales
- Family: Hymenobacteraceae
- Genus: Pontibacter
- Species: P. ramchanderi

Binomial name
- Pontibacter ramchanderi Singh et al. 2013

Type strain
- CCM 8406, MCC 2019, LP43

Species of bacterium

Pontibacter ramchanderi is a Gram-negative, rod-shaped and motile bacterium from the genus Pontibacter which has been isolated from a pond which was contaminated with hexachlorocyclohexane in Lucknow in India.
