= Pontibacter aurantiacus =

Scientific classification
- Domain: Bacteria
- Kingdom: Pseudomonadati
- Phylum: Bacteroidota
- Class: Cytophagia
- Order: Cytophagales
- Family: Hymenobacteraceae
- Genus: Pontibacter
- Species: P. aurantiacus

Binomial name
- Pontibacter aurantiacus Singh et al. 2017

Type strain
- CCM 8697, KCTC 42943, MCC 2931, NP1

Species of bacterium

Pontibacter aurantiacus is a Gram-negative and rod-shaped bacterium from the genus Pontibacter which has been isolated from soil which was contaminated with hexachlorocyclohexane from Ummari in India.
