= Pontibacter virosus =

Scientific classification
- Domain: Bacteria
- Kingdom: Pseudomonadati
- Phylum: Bacteroidota
- Class: Cytophagia
- Order: Cytophagales
- Family: Hymenobacteraceae
- Genus: Pontibacter
- Species: P. virosus

Binomial name
- Pontibacter virosus Kohli et al. 2016

Type strain
- DSM 100231, KCTC 42941, MCC 2932, W14

Species of bacterium

Pontibacter virosus is a Gram-negative, rod-shaped and motile bacterium from the genus Pontibacter which has been isolated from soil which was contaminated with hexachlorocyclohexane from Ummari in India.
