= Pontibacter chinhatensis =

Scientific classification
- Domain: Bacteria
- Kingdom: Pseudomonadati
- Phylum: Bacteroidota
- Class: Cytophagia
- Order: Cytophagales
- Family: Hymenobacteraceae
- Genus: Pontibacter
- Species: P. chinhatensis

Binomial name
- Pontibacter chinhatensis Singh et al. 2015

Type strain
- CCM 8436, MCC 2070, LP51

Species of bacterium

Pontibacter chinhatensis is a Gram-negative, halotolerant and rod-shaped bacterium from the genus Pontibacter which has been isolated from sediments from a pond near a hexachlorocyclohexane dumpsite in Lucknow in India.
