= Pontibacter toksunensis =

Scientific classification
- Domain: Bacteria
- Kingdom: Pseudomonadati
- Phylum: Bacteroidota
- Class: Cytophagia
- Order: Cytophagales
- Family: Hymenobacteraceae
- Genus: Pontibacter
- Species: P. toksunensis

Binomial name
- Pontibacter toksunensis Zhang et al. 2013

Type strain
- CCTCC AB 208003, KCTC 23984, ZLD-7

Synonyms
- Pontibacter toksun

Species of bacterium

Pontibacter toksunensis is a Gram-negative, rod-shaped and non-motile bacterium from the genus Pontibacter which has been isolated from soil from Xinjiang in China.
