= Scirpophaga ochroleuca =

Scientific classification
- Kingdom: Animalia
- Phylum: Arthropoda
- Class: Insecta
- Order: Lepidoptera
- Family: Crambidae
- Genus: Scirpophaga
- Species: S. ochroleuca

Binomial name
- Scirpophaga ochroleuca Meyrick, 1882

Species of moth

Scirpophaga ochroleuca is a moth in the family Crambidae. It was described by Edward Meyrick in 1882. It is found on New Guinea and in Australia, where it has been recorded from Queensland.

The wingspan is 15–18 mm for males and 19–29 mm for females.
