= Pontibacter niistensis =

Scientific classification
- Domain: Bacteria
- Kingdom: Pseudomonadati
- Phylum: Bacteroidota
- Class: Cytophagia
- Order: Cytophagales
- Family: Hymenobacteraceae
- Genus: Pontibacter
- Species: P. niistensis

Binomial name
- Pontibacter niistensis Dastager et al. 2010

Type strain
- CCTCC AA 209057, NCIM 5339, NII-0905, NII-23

Species of bacterium

Pontibacter niistensis is a Gram-negative and rod-shaped bacterium from the genus Pontibacter which has been isolated from forest soil from the Western Ghats in India.
