= Pontibacter yuliensis =

Scientific classification
- Domain: Bacteria
- Kingdom: Pseudomonadati
- Phylum: Bacteroidota
- Class: Cytophagia
- Order: Cytophagales
- Family: Hymenobacteraceae
- Genus: Pontibacter
- Species: P. yuliensis

Binomial name
- Pontibacter yuliensis Cao et al. 2014

Type strain
- CCTCC AB 2013047, KCTC 32396, H9X

Species of bacterium

Pontibacter yuliensis is a Gram-negative and rod-shaped bacterium from the genus Pontibacter which has been isolated from soil from a Populus euphratica forest in the Taklamakan Desert in Xinjiang in China.
