= Scirpophaga auristrigellus =

Scientific classification
- Kingdom: Animalia
- Phylum: Arthropoda
- Class: Insecta
- Order: Lepidoptera
- Family: Crambidae
- Genus: Scirpophaga
- Species: S. auristrigellus

Binomial name
- Scirpophaga auristrigellus (Hampson, 1896)

Synonyms
- Schoenobius auristrigellus Hampson, 1896

Species of moth

Scirpophaga auristrigellus is a moth in the family Crambidae. It was described by George Hampson in 1896. It is found in Guangxi, China, India and Bhutan.

The wingspan is 20–26 mm. The forewings are pale yellow, but yellow between the veins.
