= Scirpophaga aurivena =

Scientific classification
- Kingdom: Animalia
- Phylum: Arthropoda
- Class: Insecta
- Order: Lepidoptera
- Family: Crambidae
- Genus: Scirpophaga
- Species: S. aurivena

Binomial name
- Scirpophaga aurivena (Hampson, 1903)

Synonyms
- Schoenobius aurivena Hampson, 1903

Species of moth

Scirpophaga aurivena is a moth in the family Crambidae. It was described by George Hampson in 1903. It is found in the Khasi Hills of north-eastern India.

The wingspan is 19–22 mm.
