= Scirpophaga terrella =

Scientific classification
- Kingdom: Animalia
- Phylum: Arthropoda
- Class: Insecta
- Order: Lepidoptera
- Family: Crambidae
- Genus: Scirpophaga
- Species: S. terrella

Binomial name
- Scirpophaga terrella Hampson, 1896

Synonyms
- Scirpophaga terrellus

Species of moth

Scirpophaga terrella is a moth in the family Crambidae. It is found in Paraná, Brazil.

The wingspan is about 34 mm. The wings are dull yellowish brown, irrorated (speckled) with fuscous.
