= Scirpophaga linguatella =

Scientific classification
- Kingdom: Animalia
- Phylum: Arthropoda
- Clade: Pancrustacea
- Class: Insecta
- Order: Lepidoptera
- Family: Crambidae
- Genus: Scirpophaga
- Species: S. linguatella

Binomial name
- Scirpophaga linguatella Chen, Song & Wu, 2006

Species of moth

Scirpophaga linguatella is a moth in the family Crambidae. It was described by Fu-Qiang Chen, Shi-Mei Song and Chun-Sheng Wu in 2006. It is found in Yunnan, China.

Both the forewings and hindwings are uniform white.
