= Pontibacter diazotrophicus =

Scientific classification
- Domain: Bacteria
- Kingdom: Pseudomonadati
- Phylum: Bacteroidota
- Class: Cytophagia
- Order: Cytophagales
- Family: Hymenobacteraceae
- Genus: Pontibacter
- Species: P. diazotrophicus

Binomial name
- Pontibacter diazotrophicus Xu et al. 2014

Type strain
- CCTCC AB 2013049, NRRL B-59974, H4X

Species of bacterium

Pontibacter diazotrophicus is a nitrogen-fixing, Gram-negative and rod-shaped bacterium from the genus Pontibacter which has been isolated from sand from the Taklamakan Desert, China.
