= Scirpophaga melanoclista =

Scientific classification
- Kingdom: Animalia
- Phylum: Arthropoda
- Class: Insecta
- Order: Lepidoptera
- Family: Crambidae
- Genus: Scirpophaga
- Species: S. melanoclista

Binomial name
- Scirpophaga melanoclista Meyrick, 1935

Species of moth

Scirpophaga melanoclista is a moth in the family Crambidae. It was described by Edward Meyrick in 1935. It is found in Angola, the Democratic Republic of the Congo, Ghana, Madagascar, Senegal, Sierra Leone and Zambia.
