= Scirpophaga gilviberbis =

Scientific classification
- Kingdom: Animalia
- Phylum: Arthropoda
- Clade: Pancrustacea
- Class: Insecta
- Order: Lepidoptera
- Family: Crambidae
- Genus: Scirpophaga
- Species: S. gilviberbis

Binomial name
- Scirpophaga gilviberbis Zeller, 1863

Synonyms
- Niphadoses gilviberbis

Species of moth

Scirpophaga gilviberbis is a moth in the family Crambidae. It was described by Philipp Christoph Zeller in 1863. It is found on the Comoros and in the Democratic Republic of the Congo, Kenya, South Africa, Zambia, India, Indonesia (Java, Sulawesi), Myanmar, Singapore, Thailand and Vietnam.

The wingspan is 20–22 mm for males and 23–35 mm for females.

The larvae feed on Oryza species, including Oryza sativa.
