= Pontibacter amylolyticus =

Scientific classification
- Domain: Bacteria
- Kingdom: Pseudomonadati
- Phylum: Bacteroidota
- Class: Cytophagia
- Order: Cytophagales
- Family: Hymenobacteraceae
- Genus: Pontibacter
- Species: P. amylolyticus

Binomial name
- Pontibacter amylolyticus Wu et al. 2016

Species of bacterium

Pontibacter amylolyticus is a Gram-negative and short rod-shaped bacterium from the genus Pontibacter which has been isolated from sediments from a hydrothermal vent field from the Indian Ridge.
