= Pontibacter korlensis =

Scientific classification
- Domain: Bacteria
- Kingdom: Pseudomonadati
- Phylum: Bacteroidota
- Class: Cytophagia
- Order: Cytophagales
- Family: Hymenobacteraceae
- Genus: Pontibacter
- Species: P. korlensis

Binomial name
- Pontibacter korlensis Zhang et al. 2008

Type strain
- CCTCC AB 206081, NRRL B-51097, X14-1

Species of bacterium

Pontibacter korlensis is a Gram-negative and rod-shaped bacterium from the genus Pontibacter which has been isolated from the desert of Xinjiang in China.
