= Pontibacter deserti =

Scientific classification
- Domain: Bacteria
- Kingdom: Pseudomonadati
- Phylum: Bacteroidota
- Class: Cytophagia
- Order: Cytophagales
- Family: Hymenobacteraceae
- Genus: Pontibacter
- Species: P. deserti

Binomial name
- Pontibacter deserti Subhash et al. 2014

Type strain
- JC215, KCTC 32443, LMG 27670

Species of bacterium

Pontibacter deserti is a Gram-negative bacterium from the genus Pontibacter.
