= Pontibacter humi =

Scientific classification
- Domain: Bacteria
- Kingdom: Pseudomonadati
- Phylum: Bacteroidota
- Class: Cytophagia
- Order: Cytophagales
- Family: Hymenobacteraceae
- Genus: Pontibacter
- Species: P. humi

Binomial name
- Pontibacter humi Srinivasan et al. 2015

Type strain
- JCM 19178, KEMC 9004-131, SWU8

Species of bacterium

Pontibacter humi is a Gram-negative, aerobic, rod-shaped and non-motile bacterium from the genus Pontibacter which has been isolated from mountain soil in Korea.
