= Scirpophaga bipunctatus =

Scientific classification
- Domain: Eukaryota
- Kingdom: Animalia
- Phylum: Arthropoda
- Class: Insecta
- Order: Lepidoptera
- Family: Crambidae
- Genus: Scirpophaga
- Species: S. bipunctatus

Binomial name
- Scirpophaga bipunctatus (Rothschild in Sjöstedt, 1926)

Synonyms
- Schoenobius bipunctatus Rothschild in Sjöstedt, 1926

Species of moth

Scirpophaga bipunctatus is a moth in the family Crambidae. It was described by Rothschild in 1926. It is found in Sudan.
