= Scirpophaga brunnealis =

Scientific classification
- Kingdom: Animalia
- Phylum: Arthropoda
- Class: Insecta
- Order: Lepidoptera
- Family: Crambidae
- Genus: Scirpophaga
- Species: S. brunnealis

Binomial name
- Scirpophaga brunnealis (Hampson, 1919)

Synonyms
- Topeutis brunnealis Hampson, 1919

Species of moth

Scirpophaga brunnealis is a moth in the family Crambidae. It was described by George Hampson in 1919. It is found in Myanmar and Nepal.
