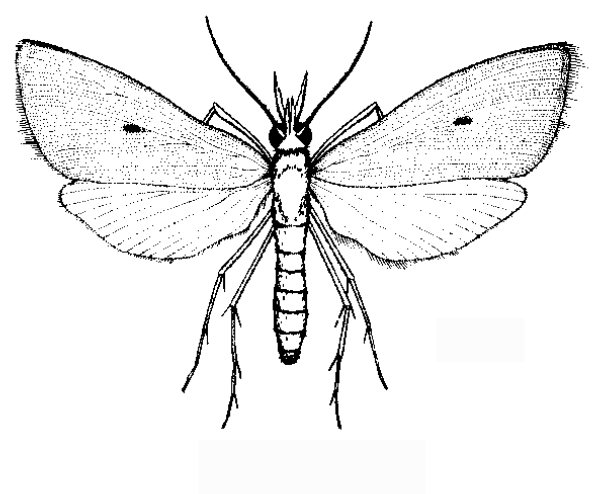

Scientific classification
- Kingdom: Animalia
- Phylum: Arthropoda
- Clade: Pancrustacea
- Class: Insecta
- Order: Lepidoptera
- Superfamily: Pyraloidea
- Family: Crambidae
- Subfamily: Schoenobiinae
- Genus: Scirpophaga
- Species: S. incertulas

Binomial name
- Scirpophaga incertulas (Walker, 1863)

Synonyms
- Chilo incertulas Walker, 1863; Chilo incertellus Walker, 1917; Catagela admotella Walker, 1863; Schoenobius punctellus Zeller, 1863; Schoenobius minutellus Zeller, 1863; Tipanaea bipunctifera Walker, 1863; Chilo gratiosellus Walker, 1864; Schoenobius bipunctifer ab. quadripunctellifera Strand, 1918

= Scirpophaga incertulas =

Yellow stem borer

Species of moth

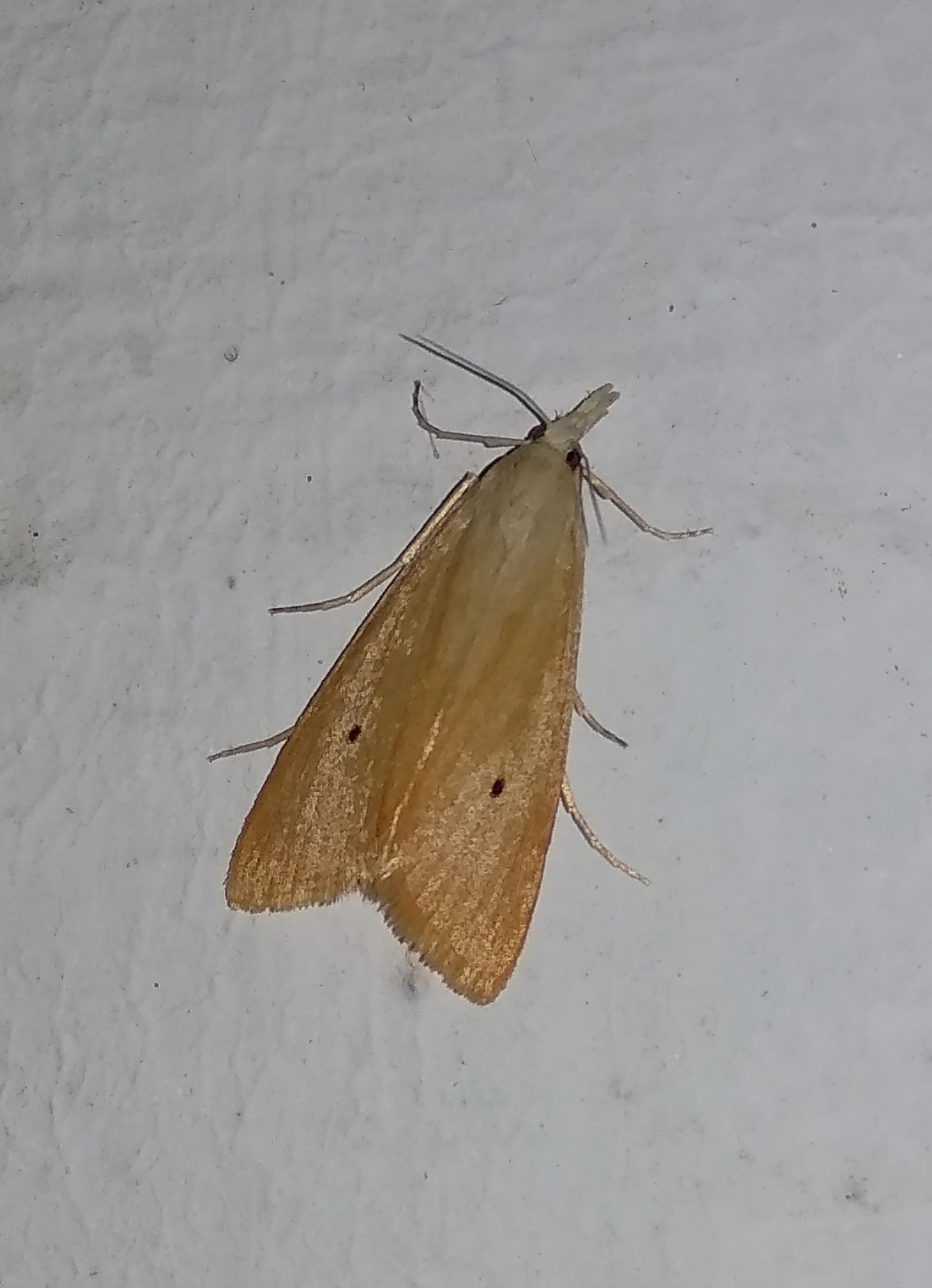
Scirpophaga incertulas, rice yellow stem borer

Scirpophaga incertulas, the yellow stem borer or rice yellow stem borer, is a species of moth of the family Crambidae. It was described by Francis Walker in 1863. It is found in Afghanistan, Nepal, north-eastern India, Sri Lanka, Bangladesh, Myanmar, Vietnam, Thailand, Malaysia, Singapore, Sumatra, Java, Borneo, Sumba, Sulawesi, the Philippines, Taiwan, China and Japan.

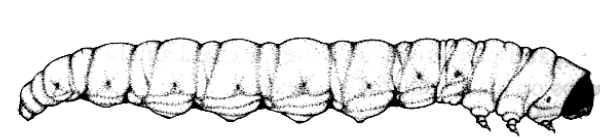
Larva

== Description ==
The wingspan of the male is 18–22 mm and the female is 34 mm. Adult males are smaller than the females. Males are brownish ochreous. Forewings irrorated (sprinkled) with dark scales and with the veins slightly streaked with fuscous. A black spot found at lower angle of cell. There is an oblique fuscous line runs from apex to vein 2. A marginal black specks series can be seen. Hindwings ochreous white. Female fuscous brown with pale fuscous hindwings.

== Ecology ==
The larvae feed on Oryza sativa. It is considered as a major rice pest throughout India, Sri Lanka as well as in various parts of Nepal, and it devastates harvests annually. They bore the stem of their host plant.

== Damage ==
After hatching, early instars bore into the leaf sheath and causing longitudinal yellowish-white patches as a result of feeding. Then it invades the stem of the rice plant and stays in the pith to feed on the inner surface of the stem wall. These are not externally visual as symptoms. Severe feeding causes a deep circular cut through the parenchyma tissue showing deadhearts at the vegetative stages and whiteheads at the reproductive stages.

== Control ==
Due to heavy damage to rice throughout the world, many controlling measures are underway. Chemical, physical, and biological controls and many traditional methods are used to control the pest at any stage of its life cycle. Numerous pest resistant paddy varieties have been genetically modified and introduced in to the fields by the local governments. In biological control, egg parasitism is high and widespread. Species of the three genera Telenomus, Tetrastichus and Trichogramma are greatly effective against eggs, larva and adult moths.

Conocephalus longipennis, a bush cricket is known to consume moth eggs. Other than insect parasitoids, fungi, bacteria, viruses and mermithid nematodes are also used for Integrated Pest Management (IPM). Split release of Trichogramma japonicum improved control in Nagaland, India Applications of Chlorantraniliprole has been found to reduce the hopper injuries.
