= Pontibacter litorisediminis =

Scientific classification
- Domain: Bacteria
- Kingdom: Pseudomonadati
- Phylum: Bacteroidota
- Class: Cytophagia
- Order: Cytophagales
- Family: Hymenobacteraceae
- Genus: Pontibacter
- Species: P. litorisediminis

Binomial name
- Pontibacter litorisediminis Park et al. 2016

Type strain
- KCTC 52252, NBRC 112298, YKTF-7

Species of bacterium

Pontibacter litorisediminis is a Gram-negative, aerobic and motile bacterium from the genus Pontibacter which has been isolated from tidal flat sediments from the Yellow Sea in Korea.
