= Scirpophaga xantharrenes =

Scientific classification
- Domain: Eukaryota
- Kingdom: Animalia
- Phylum: Arthropoda
- Class: Insecta
- Order: Lepidoptera
- Family: Crambidae
- Genus: Scirpophaga
- Species: S. xantharrenes

Binomial name
- Scirpophaga xantharrenes Common, 1960

Species of moth

Scirpophaga xantharrenes is a moth in the family Crambidae. It was described by Ian Francis Bell Common in 1960. It is found in Australia, where it has been recorded from Queensland.
