= Scirpophaga virginia =

Scientific classification
- Domain: Eukaryota
- Kingdom: Animalia
- Phylum: Arthropoda
- Class: Insecta
- Order: Lepidoptera
- Family: Crambidae
- Genus: Scirpophaga
- Species: S. virginia

Binomial name
- Scirpophaga virginia Schultze, 1908

Species of moth

Scirpophaga virginia is a moth in the family Crambidae. It was described by Schultze in 1908. It is found in China (Heilongjiang, Beijing, Shandong, Henan, Shaanxi, Shanghai, Jiangsu, Anhui, Hubei, Jiangxi, Hunan, Fujian, Guangxi, Yunnan), Taiwan, Japan, Bangladesh, Vietnam, Thailand, Sri Lanka, western Malaysia, Singapore, Borneo, Sumatra and the Philippines.

The wingspan is 13–17 mm for males and 16–22 mm for females.

The larvae feed on Oryza sativa.
