= Pontibacter populi =

Scientific classification
- Domain: Bacteria
- Kingdom: Pseudomonadati
- Phylum: Bacteroidota
- Class: Cytophagia
- Order: Cytophagales
- Family: Hymenobacteraceae
- Genus: Pontibacter
- Species: P. populi

Binomial name
- Pontibacter populi Xu et al. 2012

Type strain
- CCTCC AB 206239, NRRL B-59488, HYL7-15

Species of bacterium

Pontibacter populi is a Gram-negative, rod-shaped and non-motile bacterium from the genus Pontibacter which has been isolated from soil from a Populus euphratica forest in Xinjiang in China.
