= Scirpophaga fusciflua =

Scientific classification
- Kingdom: Animalia
- Phylum: Arthropoda
- Class: Insecta
- Order: Lepidoptera
- Family: Crambidae
- Genus: Scirpophaga
- Species: S. fusciflua

Binomial name
- Scirpophaga fusciflua Hampson, 1893

Species of moth

Scirpophaga fusciflua is a moth in the family Crambidae. It was described by George Hampson in 1893. It is found in Taiwan, Afghanistan, India, Nepal, Thailand and Sri Lanka.

The wingspan is 16–22 mm for males and 21–27 mm for females.

The larvae feed on Oryza sativa.
