= Scirpophaga micraurea =

Scientific classification
- Domain: Eukaryota
- Kingdom: Animalia
- Phylum: Arthropoda
- Class: Insecta
- Order: Lepidoptera
- Family: Crambidae
- Genus: Scirpophaga
- Species: S. micraurea

Binomial name
- Scirpophaga micraurea Sasaki, 1994

Species of moth

Scirpophaga micraurea is a moth in the family Crambidae. It was described by Sasaki in 1994. It is found in Japan.
