= Scirpophaga goliath =

Scientific classification
- Kingdom: Animalia
- Phylum: Arthropoda
- Class: Insecta
- Order: Lepidoptera
- Family: Crambidae
- Genus: Scirpophaga
- Species: S. goliath

Binomial name
- Scirpophaga goliath Marion & Viette, 1953

Species of moth

Scirpophaga goliath is a moth in the family Crambidae. It was described by Hubert Marion and Pierre Viette in 1953. It is found on Madagascar.

The wingspan is 46–52 mm.
