= Pontibacter ruber =

Scientific classification
- Domain: Bacteria
- Kingdom: Pseudomonadati
- Phylum: Bacteroidota
- Class: Cytophagia
- Order: Cytophagales
- Family: Hymenobacteraceae
- Genus: Pontibacter
- Species: P. ruber

Binomial name
- Pontibacter ruber Subhash et al. 2014

Type strain
- JC213, KCTC 32442, LMG 27669

Species of bacterium

Pontibacter ruber is a Gram-negative bacterium from the genus Pontibacter.
