= Pontibacter locisalis =

Scientific classification
- Domain: Bacteria
- Kingdom: Pseudomonadati
- Phylum: Bacteroidota
- Class: Cytophagia
- Order: Cytophagales
- Family: Hymenobacteraceae
- Genus: Pontibacter
- Species: P. locisalis

Binomial name
- Pontibacter locisalis Zhou et al. 2016

Type strain
- CICC AB 2015060, KCTC 42498, strain Sy30

Species of bacterium

Pontibacter locisalis is a Gram-negative, rod-shaped, aerobic and non-motile bacterium from the genus Pontibacter which has been isolated from a marine saltern from Weihai in China.
