= Pontibacter rugosus =

Scientific classification
- Domain: Bacteria
- Kingdom: Pseudomonadati
- Phylum: Bacteroidota
- Class: Cytophagia
- Order: Cytophagales
- Family: Hymenobacteraceae
- Genus: Pontibacter
- Species: P. rugosus

Binomial name
- Pontibacter rugosus Kim et al. 2016

Type strain
- JCM 31319, KCTC 18739, KYW1030

Species of bacterium

Pontibacter rugosus is a Gram-negative, rod-shaped, aerobic and motile bacterium from the genus Pontibacter which has been isolated from seawater from the Gwangyang Bay in Korea.
