= Pontibacter roseus =

Scientific classification
- Domain: Bacteria
- Kingdom: Pseudomonadati
- Phylum: Bacteroidota
- Class: Cytophagia
- Order: Cytophagales
- Family: Hymenobacteraceae
- Genus: Pontibacter
- Species: P. roseus

Binomial name
- Pontibacter roseus (Suresh et al. 2006) Wang et al. 2010

Type strain
- CIP 109903, DSM 17521, MTCC 7260, SRC-1

Synonyms Sedimentibacter rubrus
- Effluviibacter roseus

Species of bacterium

Pontibacter roseus is a Gram-negative bacterium from the genus Pontibacter which has been isolated from muddy water from a drainage system in Chandigarh in India.
