= Pontibacter odishensis =

Scientific classification
- Domain: Bacteria
- Kingdom: Pseudomonadati
- Phylum: Bacteroidota
- Class: Cytophagia
- Order: Cytophagales
- Family: Hymenobacteraceae
- Genus: Pontibacter
- Species: P. odishensis

Binomial name
- Pontibacter odishensis Subhash et al. 2013

Type strain
- JC130, KCTC 23982, LMG 26962

Species of bacterium

Pontibacter odishensis is a bacterium from the genus Pontibacter which has been isolated from soil from a solar saltern.
