= Scirpophaga fulvilinealis =

Scientific classification
- Kingdom: Animalia
- Phylum: Arthropoda
- Class: Insecta
- Order: Lepidoptera
- Family: Crambidae
- Genus: Scirpophaga
- Species: S. fulvilinealis

Binomial name
- Scirpophaga fulvilinealis Hampson, 1900

Synonyms
- Metasia fulvilinealis

Species of moth

Scirpophaga fulvilinealis is a moth in the family Crambidae. It was described by George Hampson in 1900. It is found in Turkey.
