= Pontibacter soli =

Scientific classification
- Domain: Bacteria
- Kingdom: Pseudomonadati
- Phylum: Bacteroidota
- Class: Cytophagia
- Order: Cytophagales
- Family: Hymenobacteraceae
- Genus: Pontibacter
- Species: P. soli

Binomial name
- Pontibacter soli Dai et al. 2014

Type strain
- CCTCC AB 206240, HYL7-26, NRRL B-59490

Species of bacterium

Pontibacter soli is a bacterium from the genus Pontibacter which has been isolated from soil from the Desert Park of Huyang forest in Xinjiang in China.
