= Scirpophaga lineata =

Scientific classification
- Domain: Eukaryota
- Kingdom: Animalia
- Phylum: Arthropoda
- Class: Insecta
- Order: Lepidoptera
- Family: Crambidae
- Genus: Scirpophaga
- Species: S. lineata

Binomial name
- Scirpophaga lineata (Butler, 1879)

Synonyms
- Apurima lineata Butler, 1879; Schoenobius lineata

Species of moth

Scirpophaga lineata is a moth in the family Crambidae. It was described by Arthur Gardiner Butler in 1879. It is found in China (Jiangxi, Hainan, Yunnan), Japan, India, Malaysia and Indonesia.

The larvae feed on Oryza sativa.
