= Scirpophaga phaedima =

Scientific classification
- Domain: Eukaryota
- Kingdom: Animalia
- Phylum: Arthropoda
- Class: Insecta
- Order: Lepidoptera
- Family: Crambidae
- Genus: Scirpophaga
- Species: S. phaedima

Binomial name
- Scirpophaga phaedima Common, 1960

Species of moth

Scirpophaga phaedima is a moth in the family Crambidae. It was described by Ian Francis Bell Common in 1960. It is found in northern Australia.

The wingspan is 22–40 mm. Both the forewings and hindwings are white.
