= Pontibacter brevis =

Scientific classification
- Domain: Bacteria
- Kingdom: Pseudomonadati
- Phylum: Bacteroidota
- Class: Cytophagia
- Order: Cytophagales
- Family: Hymenobacteraceae
- Genus: Pontibacter
- Species: P. brevis

Binomial name
- Pontibacter brevis Osman et al. 2018

Type strain
- CCTCC AB 2016135, JCM 31443, strain XAAS-2

Species of bacterium

Pontibacter brevis is a Gram-negative bacterium from the genus Pontibacter which has been isolated from rhizospheric soil from the plant Tamarix ramosissima.
