= Pontibacter actiniarum =

Scientific classification
- Domain: Bacteria
- Kingdom: Pseudomonadati
- Phylum: Bacteroidota
- Class: Cytophagia
- Order: Cytophagales
- Family: Hymenobacteraceae
- Genus: Pontibacter
- Species: P. actiniarum

Binomial name
- Pontibacter actiniarum Nedashkovskaya et al. 2005

Type strain
- DSM 19842, KCTC 12367, KMM 6156, LMG 23027, Nedashkovskaya 29-5-5

Species of bacterium

Pontibacter actiniarum is a Gram-negative, heterotrophic and aerobic bacterium from the genus Pontibacter which has been isolated from the Rudnaya Bay from the Pacific Ocean.
