= Scirpophaga serenus =

Scientific classification
- Kingdom: Animalia
- Phylum: Arthropoda
- Clade: Pancrustacea
- Class: Insecta
- Order: Lepidoptera
- Family: Crambidae
- Genus: Scirpophaga
- Species: S. serenus

Binomial name
- Scirpophaga serenus (Meyrick, 1935)

Synonyms
- Schoenobius serenus Meyrick, 1935; Scirpophaga serena

Species of moth

Scirpophaga serenus is a moth in the family Crambidae. It was described by Edward Meyrick in 1935. It is found in Angola and the Democratic Republic of the Congo (Katanga, West Kasai).
