= Pontibacter akesuensis =

Scientific classification
- Domain: Bacteria
- Kingdom: Pseudomonadati
- Phylum: Bacteroidota
- Class: Cytophagia
- Order: Cytophagales
- Family: Hymenobacteraceae
- Genus: Pontibacter
- Species: P. akesuensis

Binomial name
- Pontibacter akesuensis Zhou et al. 2007

Type strain
- CCTCC AB 206086, KCTC 12758, AKS 1

Synonyms
- Chinabacter akesu

Species of bacterium

Pontibacter akesuensis is a bacterium from the genus Pontibacter which has been isolated from desert soil in Akesu in China.
