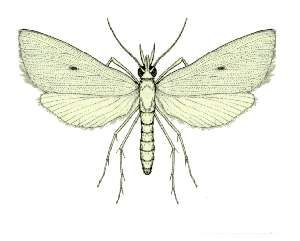
- Scirpophaga innotata

Scientific classification
- Kingdom: Animalia
- Phylum: Arthropoda
- Clade: Pancrustacea
- Class: Insecta
- Order: Lepidoptera
- Family: Crambidae
- Subfamily: Schoenobiinae
- Genus: Scirpophaga; Treitschke, 1832

Synonyms
- Apurima Walker, 1863; Schoenophaga Duponchel, 1836; Schoinophaga Sodoffsky, 1837; Schoenophaga J. L. R. Agassiz, 1847; Spartophaga Duponchel, 1836; Tryporyza Common, 1960

= Scirpophaga =

Genus of moths

Scirpophaga is a genus of moths of the family Crambidae described by Georg Friedrich Treitschke in 1832. Asian species include significant rice stemborer pests.

== Taxonomy ==
The genus Scirpophaga was first introduced by Treitschke in 1832 as a monotypic genus; including as single species Scirpophaga phantasmatella (which he misspelled as S. phantasmella, and which is now known as S. praelata).

During most of history this genus has been completely confused, with most specimens being wrongly identified and most taxa being based on a type series containing numerous species. Males and females of the same species were often recognised as two independent species. Almost two centuries after the first species was described, in 1960 the Australian entomologist Ian Francis Bell Common was the first to examine the genitalia (for centuries the standard method by which one determines species in Lepidoptera) of the Australian specimens in this group, recombining and splitting the then defined genera into a number of new genera. He created the new genus Tryporyza, in which he incorporated two species: Chilo incertulas and Tipanaea innotata (of which DNA research in 2019 has shown should be synonymised with Scirpophaga nivella). In 1980 P. Wang also classified Scirpophaga nivella within the genus Tryporyza, only to have Angoon Lewvanich, after an exhaustive study of the genitals of over 6000 specimens from throughout the range of the group, to retire the genus Tryporyza as a synonym of Scirpophaga in the following year (1981).

Treitschke gives as etymology for the generic epithet the word Scirpus, a type of plant commonly known as a "rush", and the Ancient Greek word φαγεῖν (transliterated phageîn), which means "to eat".

== Description ==
Palpi porrect (extending forward) extending from once to twice the length of head, slightly hairy, and with downcurved third joint. Maxillary palp rather short and dilated with scales. A slight rounded frontal projection can be seen. Antennae of male minutely serrated, and ciliated. Patagia of male with spreading upturned hair. Tibia with outer spurs about half the length of inner. Abdomen long, where in female expanding at extremity and with very large anal tuft. Wings long and narrow. Forewings with vein 3 from before angle of cell. Veins 4 and 5 from angle and vein 7 straight and well separated from veins 8 and 9. Veins 10 and 11 free, or vein 11 becoming coincident with vein 12. Hindwings with vein 3 from near angle of cell. Veins 6 and 7 from upper angle.

== Species ==
- praelata species group
  - Scirpophaga gilviberbis Zeller, 1863
  - Scirpophaga humilis Wang, Li & Chen, 1986
  - Scirpophaga imparellus (Meyrick, 1878)
  - Scirpophaga melanoclista Meyrick, 1935
  - Scirpophaga nivella (Fabricius, 1794)
  - Scirpophaga parvalis (Wileman, 1911)
  - Scirpophaga percna Common, 1960
  - Scirpophaga praelata (Scopoli, 1763)
  - Scirpophaga phaedima Common, 1960
  - Scirpophaga xantharrenes Common, 1960
  - Scirpophaga xanthopygata Schawerda, 1922
- excerptalis species group
  - Scirpophaga adunctella Chen, Song & Wu, 2006
  - Scirpophaga bradleyi Lewvanich, 1981
  - Scirpophaga brunnealis (Hampson, 1919)
  - Scirpophaga excerptalis (Walker, 1863)
  - Scirpophaga flavidorsalis (Hampson, 1919)
  - Scirpophaga khasis Lewvanich, 1981
  - Scirpophaga linguatella Chen, Song & Wu, 2006
  - Scirpophaga magnella de Joannis, 1930
  - Scirpophaga ochritinctalis (Hampson, 1919)
  - Scirpophaga xanthogastrella (Walker, 1863)
  - Scirpophaga tongyaii Lewvanich, 1981
- occidentella species group
  - Scirpophaga fusciflua Hampson, 1893
  - Scirpophaga goliath Marion & Viette, 1953
  - Scirpophaga marginepunctellus (de Joannis, 1927)
  - Scirpophaga occidentella (Walker, 1863)
  - Scirpophaga ochroleuca Meyrick, 1882
  - Scirpophaga serenus (Meyrick, 1935)
  - Scirpophaga subumbrosa Meyrick, 1933
  - Scirpophaga virginia Schultze, 1908
- lineata species group
  - Scirpophaga lineata (Butler, 1879)
  - Scirpophaga auristrigellus (Hampson, 1896)
  - Scirpophaga aurivena (Hampson, 1903)
- incertulas species group
  - Scirpophaga incertulas (Walker, 1863)
  - Scirpophaga innotata (Walker, 1863)
- gotoi species group
  - Scirpophaga gotoi Lewvanich, 1981
- whalleyi species group
  - Scirpophaga whalleyi Lewvanich, 1981
- unknown species group
  - Scirpophaga bipunctatus (Rothschild in Sjöstedt, 1926)
  - Scirpophaga fulvilinealis Hampson, 1900
  - Scirpophaga kumatai Lewvanich, 1981
  - Scirpophaga micraurea Sasaki, 1994
  - Scirpophaga nepalensis Lewvanich, 1981
  - Scirpophaga terrella Hampson, 1896
