= Scirpophaga xanthogastrella =

Scientific classification
- Kingdom: Animalia
- Phylum: Arthropoda
- Class: Insecta
- Order: Lepidoptera
- Family: Crambidae
- Genus: Scirpophaga
- Species: S. xanthogastrella

Binomial name
- Scirpophaga xanthogastrella (Walker, 1863)

Synonyms
- Apurima xanthogastrella Walker, 1863; Apurima costalis Moore, 1886

Species of moth

Scirpophaga xanthogastrella is a moth in the family Crambidae. It was described by Francis Walker in 1863. It is found in Taiwan, India, Nepal, Sri Lanka and the Philippines.

The wingspan is 22–30 mm for males and 27–36 mm for females.

The larvae possibly feed on Tripidium arundinaceum (syn. Saccharum arundinaceum) and Saccharum spontaneum, but these records may be based on a misindentification.
