= Pontibacter saemangeumensis =

Scientific classification
- Domain: Bacteria
- Kingdom: Pseudomonadati
- Phylum: Bacteroidota
- Class: Cytophagia
- Order: Cytophagales
- Family: Hymenobacteraceae
- Genus: Pontibacter
- Species: P. saemangeumensis

Binomial name
- Pontibacter saemangeumensis Kang et al. 2013

Type strain
- JCM 17926, KACC 16448, GCM0142

Species of bacterium

Pontibacter saemangeumensis is a Gram-negative, rod-shaped and non-motile bacterium from the genus Pontibacter which has been isolated from seawater from the Saemangeum Tidein Korea.
