= Scirpophaga percna =

Scientific classification
- Domain: Eukaryota
- Kingdom: Animalia
- Phylum: Arthropoda
- Class: Insecta
- Order: Lepidoptera
- Family: Crambidae
- Genus: Scirpophaga
- Species: S. percna

Binomial name
- Scirpophaga percna Common, 1960

Species of moth

Scirpophaga percna is a moth in the family Crambidae. It was described by Ian Francis Bell Common in 1960. It is found on Sulawesi, on New Guinea and northern Australia, where it has been recorded from the Northern Territory and Queensland.

The wingspan is 22–25 mm for males and 24–37 mm for females.

The larvae feed on Saccharum species and possibly Eleocharis dulcis. They bore into the stems of their host plant.
