= Scirpophaga marginepunctellus =

Scientific classification
- Domain: Eukaryota
- Kingdom: Animalia
- Phylum: Arthropoda
- Class: Insecta
- Order: Lepidoptera
- Family: Crambidae
- Genus: Scirpophaga
- Species: S. marginepunctellus

Binomial name
- Scirpophaga marginepunctellus (de Joannis, 1927)

Synonyms
- Schoenobius marginepunctellus de Joannis, 1927; Scirpophaga marginepunctella

Species of moth

Scirpophaga marginepunctellus is a moth in the family Crambidae. It was described by Joseph de Joannis in 1927. It is found in Botswana, the Democratic Republic of the Congo (Katanga, West Kasai), Madagascar, Mozambique, Nigeria, Senegal and Sudan.

The wingspan is 25–30 mm for males and 36–44 mm for females.
