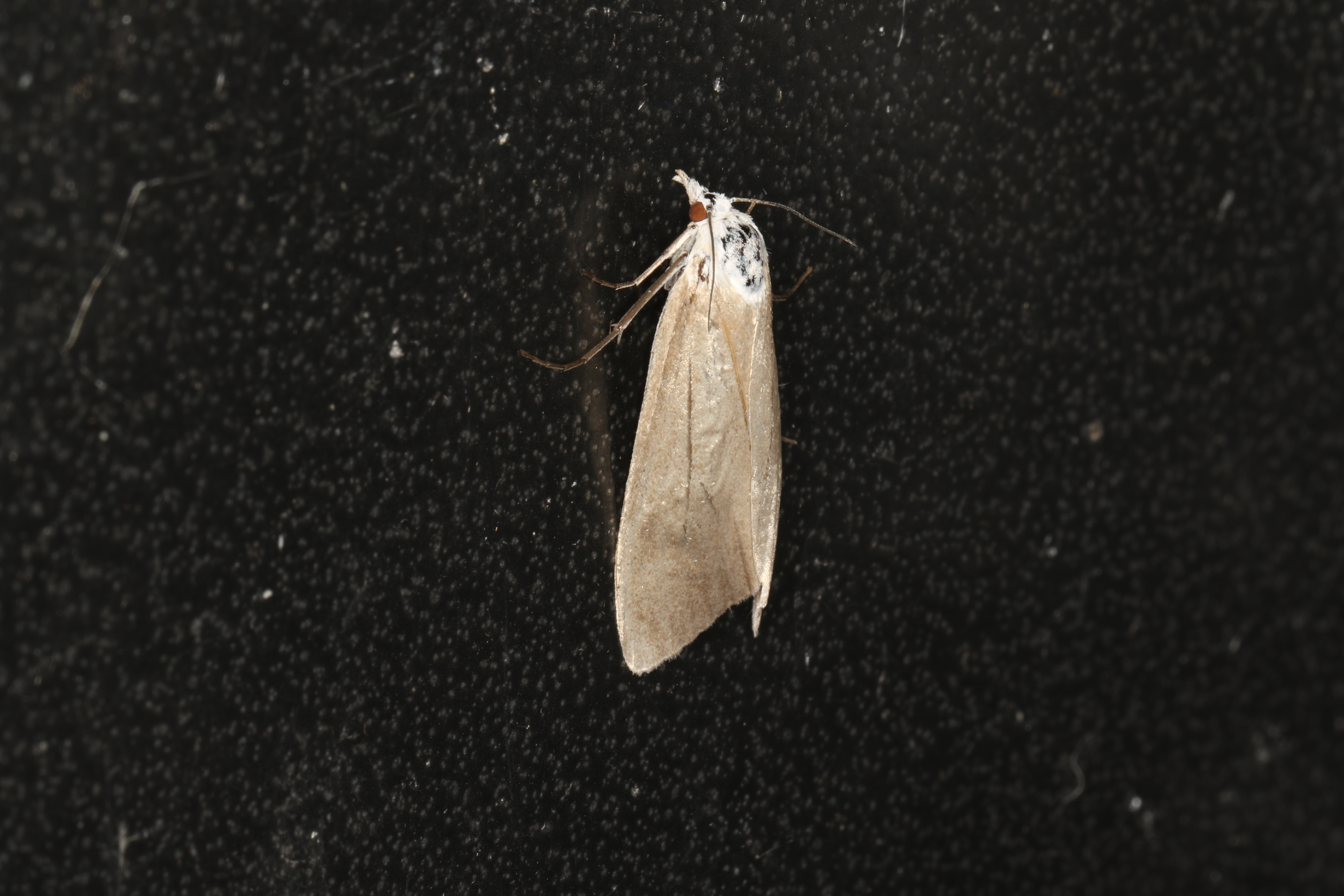

Scientific classification
- Kingdom: Animalia
- Phylum: Arthropoda
- Class: Insecta
- Order: Lepidoptera
- Family: Crambidae
- Genus: Scirpophaga
- Species: S. imparellus

Binomial name
- Scirpophaga imparellus (Meyrick, 1878)

Synonyms
- Schoenobius imparellus Meyrick, 1878; Scirpophaga imparella; Scirpophaga helodes Common, 1960

= Scirpophaga imparellus =

Species of moth

Scirpophaga imparellus is a moth in the family Crambidae. It was described by Edward Meyrick in 1878. It is found in Australia, where it has been recorded from Queensland, New South Wales and Victoria.

The larvae possibly feed on Eleocharis dulcis, Eleocharis sphacelata and Cladium articulatum.
