= Pontibacter xinjiangensis =

Scientific classification
- Domain: Bacteria
- Kingdom: Pseudomonadati
- Phylum: Bacteroidota
- Class: Cytophagia
- Order: Cytophagales
- Family: Hymenobacteraceae
- Genus: Pontibacter
- Species: P. xinjiangensis

Binomial name
- Pontibacter xinjiangensis Wang et al. 2010

Type strain
- 311-10, CCTCC AB 207200, NRRL B-51335

Species of bacterium

Pontibacter xinjiangensis is a Gram-negative, rod-shaped and aerobic and non-motile bacterium from the genus Pontibacter which has been isolated from soil from Xinjiang in China.
