= Scirpophaga ochritinctalis =

Scientific classification
- Kingdom: Animalia
- Phylum: Arthropoda
- Class: Insecta
- Order: Lepidoptera
- Family: Crambidae
- Genus: Scirpophaga
- Species: S. ochritinctalis

Binomial name
- Scirpophaga ochritinctalis (Hampson, 1919)

Synonyms
- Schoenobius ochritinctalis Hampson, 1919; Scirpophaga macrostoma Meyrick, 1933

Species of moth

Scirpophaga ochritinctalis is a moth in the family Crambidae. It was described by George Hampson in 1919. It is found in Angola, the Central African Republic, the Democratic Republic of the Congo (Kasai-Occidental, Bas-Congo), Ghana, Malawi, Nigeria, Sierra Leone, Tanzania, Uganda and Zambia.

The wingspan is 24–31 mm for males and 27–39 mm for females.
