= Global distillation =

Movement of pollutant chemicals

Global distillation, also known as the Grasshopper effect, is the geochemical process by which certain chemicals, most notably persistent organic pollutants (POPs), are vaporized and transported from warmer to colder regions of the Earth, particularly the poles and mountain tops, where they condense. Other chemicals include acidifying acids (SO_{x}) and heavy metals. The first documented use of the term was in 1975 by E.D. Goldberg to describe the vaporization of synthetic halogenated hydrocarbons which is enhanced by the presence of water. However, this effect was only believed to occur within a defined "pollution band" in the mid-latitudes of the Northern Hemisphere. Soon after, evidence of this effect was found in arctic food as well as its atmosphere. Since then, relatively high concentrations of POPs have been found in the Arctic soil and water, as well as the bodies of animals and people who live there, even though most of the chemicals have not been used in the region in appreciable amounts.

== Mechanism ==
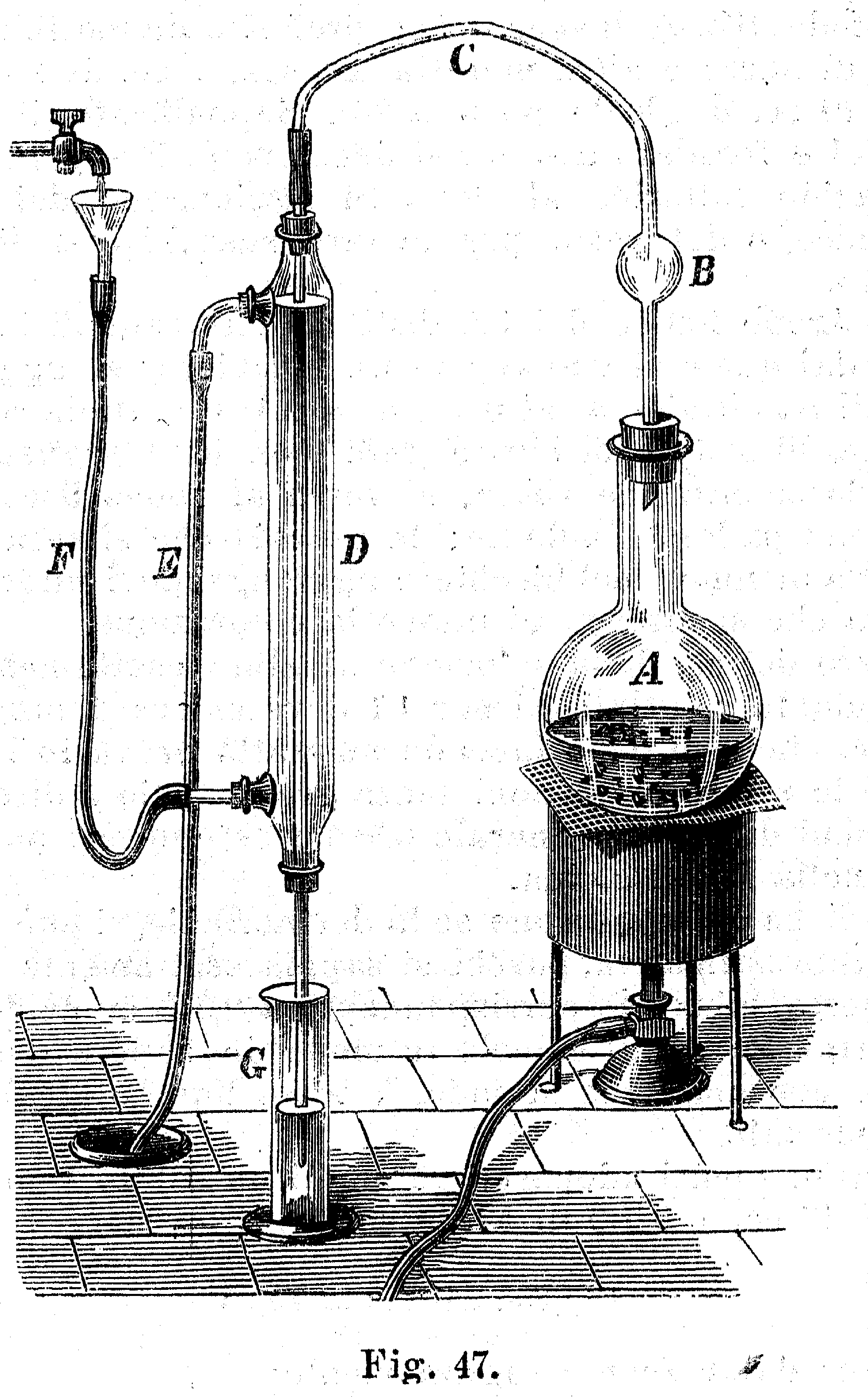
Apparatus used for distillation in chemistry

The global distillation process can be understood using the same principles that explain distillations used to make liquor or purify chemicals in a laboratory. In these processes, a substance is vaporized at a relatively high temperature, and then the vapor travels to an area of lower temperature where it condenses. A similar phenomenon occurs on a global scale for certain chemicals. When these chemicals are released into the environment, some evaporate when ambient temperatures are high and blow around on winds until temperatures are lower, when condensation occurs. Drops in temperature large enough to result in deposition can occur when chemicals are blown from warmer to cooler climates, or when seasons change. The net effect is atmospheric transport from low to high latitude and altitude. Since global distillation is a relatively slow process that relies on successive evaporation/condensation cycles, it is only effective for semi-volatile chemicals that break down very slowly in the environment, like DDT, polychlorinated biphenyls, and lindane.

== Chemicals ==
POPs are known for their resistance to degradation and their toxicity to humans and wildlife. Although most are now banned, their long-lasting capabilities have allowed them to remain in the atmosphere, soil, and water, where vaporization can occur. Two of the most common POPs that participate in global distillation are dichlorodiphenyltrichloroethane (DDT) and polychlorinated biphenyls (PCBs). DDT, once used as an insecticide, is now known to contribute to obesity and hypertension, and is a possible carcinogen. PCBs, on the other hand, can cause developmental effects in children and babies. Both chemicals are also endocrine disruptors, which involve bodily hormones. However, in 2004, the Stockholm Convention pledged to reduce or eliminate POP usage due to their negative effects.

== Effects ==
Global distillation has a profound impact on the ocean, primarily through the long-range transport of toxic chemicals that accumulate in marine ecosystems. Once in the ocean, these pollutants can be absorbed by marine organisms and enter the food chain, affecting everything from plankton to large marine mammals. Chemicals can accumulate in the fatty tissues of fish and other sea creatures, leading to toxic concentrations that can disrupt the health of marine ecosystems. This contamination jeopardizes marine biodiversity and affects fisheries, which many coastal communities rely on for sustenance and livelihoods.

Animals in polar areas are at high risk because they often rely on fat-rich diets, which increase their exposure to accumulated toxic chemicals. Species like polar bears, seals, and whales, which are top predators, accumulate high levels of POPs due to biomagnification—where these pollutants become more concentrated as they move up the food chain. These chemicals can lead to developmental abnormalities in wildlife, threatening population sustainability. Additionally, migratory species, such as birds and marine mammals, can carry these pollutants over vast distances, spreading contamination far beyond their point of origin. The toxic buildup in these species not only affects their health and survival rates but also disrupts the broader ecological balance of these fragile environments.

Global distillation also has significant consequences for human health, particularly in indigenous and remote communities that rely on traditional diets, such as fatty fish and marine mammals. Global distillation can cause social inequalities, as poleward communities such as the Inuit receive the most direct affects. As these chemicals accumulate in the environment, there is also the risk of them entering water supplies, which further amplifies the potential for human exposure. In this way, global distillation poses a significant threat not only to the environment but also to the long-term health and well-being of vulnerable populations around the world.

== Climate change ==
This process is closely linked to climate change. As global temperatures continue to rise, chemicals are more readily volatilized, further increasing atmospheric pollution. The Arctic warms at a faster rate, amplifying this effect. Ice is a known storage location for POPs and other chemicals, and when it melts, pollutants risk redistribution through ocean currents. Changes in weather patterns are another effect of climate change, which may also alter the pathways through which chemicals are transported. If they find their way into the water supply, toxic substances can pose a threat to ecosystems and human health. Global distillation and climate change create a positive feedback loop that worsens environmental degradation, making it harder to mitigate the harmful impacts on biodiversity and human well-being.

== Mitigation techniques ==
Mitigation techniques for global distillation focus on reducing the release of POPs and enhancing the detection and removal of these substances from the environment. One major advancement is the development of cleaner industrial processes that minimize the production of hazardous chemicals, particularly through improved manufacturing practices and alternative chemicals. For example, the use of non-toxic alternatives in pesticides, solvents, and industrial chemicals can greatly reduce the risk of these substances entering the atmosphere. Additionally, advancements in air filtration technologies, such as high-efficiency particulate air (HEPA) filters and activated carbon systems, can help capture airborne pollutants before they spread into the atmosphere or settle in colder regions. Reduction of fatty acids in the diet may help to reduce human contamination. Moreover, satellite and remote sensing technologies enable better tracking of the movement and deposition of POPs, providing valuable data to inform mitigation strategies. By investing in innovative clean technologies and improving pollutant tracking systems, it is possible to reduce the long-range transport of harmful chemicals and limit their environmental impact.

There is also the possibility for policy implementation, which primarily focuses on the creation of international agreements and regulatory frameworks aimed at reducing the production and use of POPs. A key example is the Stockholm Convention, a global treaty that seeks to eliminate or restrict the use of the most dangerous chemicals, including many involved in global distillation. By enforcing stricter regulations on the manufacturing and disposal of these substances, countries can collectively work to reduce the chemicals released into the atmosphere and, subsequently, their transport to polar regions. On a regional level, cross-border collaborations between countries in areas like the Arctic are essential to monitor and address the movement of pollutants.

== See also ==
- Air pollution
- Health effects of pesticides
- Solvent
- Stockholm Convention
