= Pontibacter =

Scientific classification
- Domain: Bacteria
- Kingdom: Pseudomonadati
- Phylum: Bacteroidota
- Class: Cytophagia
- Order: Cytophagales
- Family: Hymenobacteraceae
- Genus: Pontibacter; Nedashkovskaya et al. 2005

Type species
- Pontibacter actiniarum

Species
- See text

Synonyms
- Effluviibacter Suresh et al. 2006

Genus of bacteria

Pontibacter is a strictly aerobic bacterial genus from the family Hymenobacteraceae.

== Species ==
Pontibacter comprises the following species:

P. actiniarum
P. akesuensis
P. amylolyticus
P. aurantiacus
P. brevis
P. chinhatensis
P. deserti
P. diazotrophicus
P. humi
P. indicus
P. korlensis
P. litorisediminis
P. locisalis
P. lucknowensis
P. mucosus
P. niistensis
P. odishensis
P. populi
P. ramchanderi
P. roseus
P. ruber
P. rugosus
P. saemangeumensis
P. soli
P. toksunensis
P. ummariensis
P. virosus
P. xinjiangensis
P. yuliensis
