= Scirpophaga occidentella =

Scientific classification
- Kingdom: Animalia
- Phylum: Arthropoda
- Class: Insecta
- Order: Lepidoptera
- Family: Crambidae
- Genus: Scirpophaga
- Species: S. occidentella

Binomial name
- Scirpophaga occidentella (Walker, 1863)

Synonyms
- Rupela occidentella Walker, 1863

Species of moth

Scirpophaga occidentella is a moth in the family Crambidae. It was described by Francis Walker in 1863. It is found in Angola, the Democratic Republic of the Congo, Ivory Coast, Madagascar, Malawi, Mozambique, Nigeria, Senegal, Sierra Leone, South Africa and Tanzania.

The wingspan is 16–22 mm for males and 20–30 mm for females.

The larvae feed on Oryza sativa.
