= Benzene hexachloride =

Benzene hexachloride may refer to:

- Hexachlorocyclohexane
  - Lindane, its gamma isomer, an insecticide
- Hexachlorobenzene, a fungicide
