= Scirpophaga subumbrosa =

Scientific classification
- Kingdom: Animalia
- Phylum: Arthropoda
- Class: Insecta
- Order: Lepidoptera
- Family: Crambidae
- Genus: Scirpophaga
- Species: S. subumbrosa

Binomial name
- Scirpophaga subumbrosa Meyrick, 1933

Species of moth

Scirpophaga subumbrosa is a moth in the family Crambidae. It was described by Edward Meyrick in 1933. It is found in the Democratic Republic of the Congo (West Kasai, Katanga), Ethiopia, Ghana, Madagascar, Malawi, Mozambique, Nigeria, Senegal, Sierra Leone, Sudan, Tanzania and Zambia.

The wingspan is 22–28 mm for males and 28–40 mm for females.

The larvae feed on Oryza sativa.
