= Α-Hexachlorocyclohexane =

α-hexachlorocyclohexane

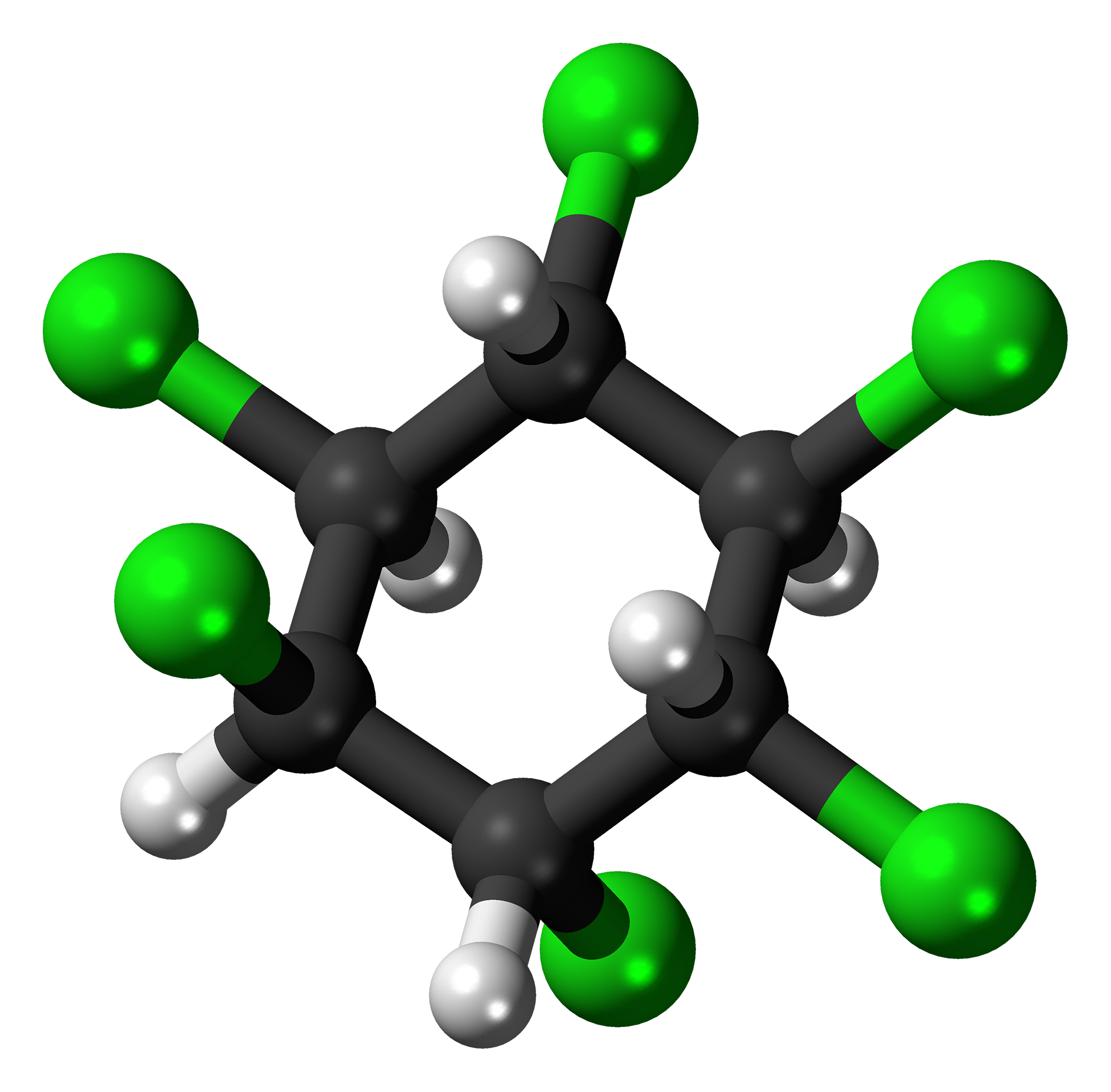

Names
- Preferred IUPAC name (1R,2R,3S,4S,5S,6S)-1,2,3,4,5,6-Hexachlorocyclohexane
- Other names α-HCH α-Benzenehexachloride α-BHC alpha-hexacloran(e) alpha-Lindane

Identifiers
CAS Number	319-84-6
3D model (JSmol)	Interactive image
ChemSpider	16740741
ECHA InfoCard	100.005.702
EC Number	206-270-8
RTECS number	GV3500000
UNII	IVM9A2N49K
UN number	2761, 2811, 3082
CompTox Dashboard (EPA)	DTXSID2020684
- InChI: InChI=1S/C6H6Cl6/c7-1-2(8)4(10)6(12)5(11)3(1)9/h1-6H/t1-,2-,3-,4-,5+,6+/m0/s1 Key: JLYXXMFPNIAWKQ-LKPKBOIGSA-N; InChI=1/C6H6Cl6/c7-1-2(8)4(10)6(12)5(11)3(1)9/h1-6H/t1-,2-,3-,4-,5+,6+/m0/s1 Key: JLYXXMFPNIAWKQ-LKPKBOIGBO
- SMILES: Cl[C@H]1[C@@H](Cl)[C@H](Cl)[C@H](Cl)[C@@H](Cl)[C@@H]1Cl

Properties
Chemical formula	C_{6}H_{6}Cl_{6}
Molar mass	290.81 g·mol^{−1}

Hazards
- GHS labelling
Pictograms	(GHS06: Toxic) (GHS07: Exclamation mark) (GHS08: Health hazard) (GHS09: Environmental hazard)
Signal word	Danger
Hazard statements	H301, H311, H331, H335, H351, H361, H370, H372, H373
Precautionary statements	P203, P260, P262, P264, P270, P271, P280, P301+P316, P302+P352, P304+P340, P308+P316, P316, P318, P319, P321, P330, P361+P364, P403+P233, P405, P501
Flash point	23 °C (73 °F; 296 K)
- Except where otherwise noted, data are given for materials in their standard state (at 25 °C [77 °F], 100 kPa). verify (what is ?) Infobox references

α-Hexachlorocyclohexane (α-HCH) is an organochloride which is one of the isomers of hexachlorocyclohexane (HCH). It is a byproduct of the production of the insecticide lindane (γ-HCH) and it is typically still contained in commercial grade lindane used as insecticide. Lindane, however, has not been produced or used in the United States for more than 20 years. At ambient temperatures it is a stable, white, powdery solid substance. As of 2009, the Stockholm Convention on Persistent Organic Pollutants classified (α-HCH) and (β-HCH) as persistent organic pollutants (POPs), due to the chemical's ability to persistence in the environment, bioaccumulative, biomagnifying, and long-range transport capacity.

== See also ==
- β-Hexachlorocyclohexane
