= Scopula nepalensis =

Scientific classification
- Kingdom: Animalia
- Phylum: Arthropoda
- Class: Insecta
- Order: Lepidoptera
- Family: Geometridae
- Genus: Scopula
- Species: S. nepalensis

Binomial name
- Scopula nepalensis Inoue, 1982

Species of geometer moth in subfamily Sterrhinae

Scopula nepalensis is a moth of the family Geometridae. It is found in Nepal.
