= Scirpophaga adunctella =

Scientific classification
- Kingdom: Animalia
- Phylum: Arthropoda
- Clade: Pancrustacea
- Class: Insecta
- Order: Lepidoptera
- Family: Crambidae
- Genus: Scirpophaga
- Species: S. adunctella

Binomial name
- Scirpophaga adunctella Chen, Song & Wu, 2006

Species of moth

Scirpophaga adunctella is a moth in the family Crambidae. It was described by Fu-Qiang Chen, Shi-Mei Song and Chun-Sheng Wu in 2006. It is found in China in Yunnan and Xizang.

The wingspan is 30–38 mm. Both the forewings and hindwings are white, females with a pale ochreous anal tuft.
