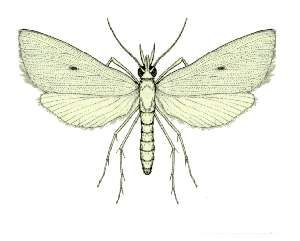

Scientific classification
- Kingdom: Animalia
- Phylum: Arthropoda
- Class: Insecta
- Order: Lepidoptera
- Superfamily: Pyraloidea
- Family: Crambidae
- Subfamily: Schoenobiinae
- Genus: Scirpophaga
- Species: S. innotata

Binomial name
- Scirpophaga innotata (Walker, 1863)

Synonyms
- Tipanaea innotata Walker, 1863; Scirpophaga sericea Snellen, 1880

= Scirpophaga innotata =

Species of moth

Scirpophaga innotata, the rice white stemborer, is a species of moth of the family Crambidae. The species was described by Francis Walker in 1863. It is found in Indonesia, Pakistan, the Philippines and the tropical north of Australia.

The larvae are considered a pest on Oryza sativa (Asian rice).
