= Scirpophaga magnella =

Scientific classification
- Domain: Eukaryota
- Kingdom: Animalia
- Phylum: Arthropoda
- Class: Insecta
- Order: Lepidoptera
- Family: Crambidae
- Genus: Scirpophaga
- Species: S. magnella

Binomial name
- Scirpophaga magnella de Joannis, 1930

Species of moth

Scirpophaga magnella is a moth in the family Crambidae. It was described by Joseph de Joannis in 1930. It is found in China (Zhejiang, Hunan, Guangdong, Hainan, Hong Kong, Guangxi, Sichuan, Yunnan, Xizang), Iran, Afghanistan, Pakistan, India, Nepal, Bangladesh, Myanmar, Thailand and Vietnam.

The wingspan is 25–40 mm for males and 32–49 mm for females.

The larvae feed on Tripidium bengalense (synonyms Saccharum bengalense and Erianthus munja).
