= Scirpophaga flavidorsalis =

Scientific classification
- Kingdom: Animalia
- Phylum: Arthropoda
- Class: Insecta
- Order: Lepidoptera
- Family: Crambidae
- Genus: Scirpophaga
- Species: S. flavidorsalis

Binomial name
- Scirpophaga flavidorsalis (Hampson, 1919)

Synonyms
- Topeutis flavidorsalis Hampson, 1919; Schoenobius melanostigmus Turner, 1922

Species of moth

Scirpophaga flavidorsalis is a moth in the family Crambidae. It was described by George Hampson in 1919. It is found in Yunnan, China, India, Bhutan, Bangladesh, Thailand, western Malaysia, Java, the Philippines, New Guinea and Australia.
