= Scirpophaga xanthopygata =

Scientific classification
- Domain: Eukaryota
- Kingdom: Animalia
- Phylum: Arthropoda
- Class: Insecta
- Order: Lepidoptera
- Family: Crambidae
- Genus: Scirpophaga
- Species: S. xanthopygata

Binomial name
- Scirpophaga xanthopygata Schawerda, 1922

Synonyms
- Scirpophaga praelata var. xanthopygata Schawerda, 1922

Species of moth

Scirpophaga xanthopygata is a species of moth in the family Crambidae. It is found in Russia, Ukraine, Korea, eastern China, Japan, Vietnam and Taiwan.

The wingspan is 22–41 mm for males and 23–47 mm for females.
