= Trichogramma japonicum =

Scientific classification
- Kingdom: Animalia
- Phylum: Arthropoda
- Clade: Pancrustacea
- Class: Insecta
- Order: Hymenoptera
- Family: Trichogrammatidae
- Genus: Trichogramma
- Species: T. japonicum

Binomial name
- Trichogramma japonicum Ashmead, 1904

Species of wasp

Trichogramma japonicum is a minute wasp parasitoid from the Trichogrammatidae family in the order Hymenoptera. T. japonicum parasitizes the eggs of many pest species, especially Lepidoptera found in many monocultures. They are entomophagous parasitoids that deposit their eggs inside the host species' egg, consuming the host egg material and emerging from the egg once development is complete. T. japonicum can be found naturally in rice ecosystems, but are dispersed commercially to many monocultures as a biological control. The mitochondrial genomes of T. japonicum are significantly rearranged when comparing it to related insects.

== Reproduction ==
Trichogramma japonicum is an egg parasitoid of several insect species, many pests to crops. Sex pheromones are released by females to attract males who are searching for suitable mates. Once the female's eggs have been fertilized, she will search for a host species to lay her eggs in. Each female produces approximately 45 offspring. T. japonicum uses chemical signals produced from herbivore-induced damaged host plants to locate the eggs of the host insects. Once a suitable host is found, she will use her dramatically long ovipositor to insert her eggs directly into the host egg's deep layers.

== Chemical sensing ==
Trichogramma japonicum senses chemicals through olfactory receptors located mainly on the face. Females have more chemoreceptors on their heads than males, which may be due to females needing to identify and locate volatile odours during host or mate localization. T. japonicum relies on long-range chemical emissions from damaged plants in order to locate hosts. They are able to discriminate between plants that have been injured and plants that are untouched by sensing the chemical emissions. The parasitoid will also respond to close-range chemical emissions from various Lepidopteran by-products. Lepidoptera will inadvertently leave behind chemical-inducing objects that can attract the egg parasitoid. Lepidoptera can leave behind female wing scales, larva saliva, footprints, and egg wash which will act like kairomones and attract the parasitoid. T. japonicum will not start looking for a host if there is no volatile stimulation.

== Ecological influence ==
=== Biological control agent ===
Trichogramma japonicum is an important natural enemy of pests in agro-eco-systems. T. japonicum is a very successful biological control for the rice stem borer, Scirpophaga incertulas. In order for this species to be a successful biological control, the wasps need to have time-specific multiple releases. The times for these releases would be based on the climate conditions and pest biology. The consideration of these variables allows for the wasps to be the most effective. Other factors can also influence T. japonicum's activity against the rice yellow stem borer. The synthetic forms of natural chemicals were found to increase the parasitic activity of the wasps by enhancing their egg parasitism T. japonicum is also an amazing biological control for Cnaphalocrocis medinalis. These wasps have been found to be a better control agent than insecticides

While T. japonicum may not be as effective as insecticides for all agricultural pests, such as Chilo suppressalis. The wasps can still prevent adverse effects of Chilo suppressalis to a controlled range, it just isn't as effective as some pesticides. Even though T. japonicum is not always as efficient as insecticides, it should be considered a very good initial option. T. japonicum as a biological could greatly improve natural enemy populations, which will help prolong the effects of pest control. The use of these wasps will also help protect the ecological environment, reduce pollination of fields, and ensure safe agricultural products.

=== Effects of insecticides ===
The two most toxic types of pesticides for T. japonicum are organophosphates and carbamates. One study found that the highest mortality rate in T. japonicum is observed when acephate, an organophosphate, is used as a treatment. The introduction of these insecticides when T. japonicum are being used will greatly reduce the wasps' effectiveness as a biological control. If a pesticide is to be used alongside T. japonicum, it should be an insect growth regulator as it has the lowest toxicity rate. The adverse effects of insecticides are primarily seen in adults as they are more sensitive to the pesticides than juvenile forms. The larval stages of T. japonicum are protected from the insecticides by the egg of the host species.
