= Scirpophaga nepalensis =

Scientific classification
- Domain: Eukaryota
- Kingdom: Animalia
- Phylum: Arthropoda
- Class: Insecta
- Order: Lepidoptera
- Family: Crambidae
- Genus: Scirpophaga
- Species: S. nepalensis

Binomial name
- Scirpophaga nepalensis Lewvanich, 1981

Species of moth

Scirpophaga nepalensis is a moth in the family Crambidae. It was described by Angoon Lewvanich in 1981. It is found in Nepal.
