= Scirpophaga parvalis =

Scientific classification
- Domain: Eukaryota
- Kingdom: Animalia
- Phylum: Arthropoda
- Class: Insecta
- Order: Lepidoptera
- Family: Crambidae
- Genus: Scirpophaga
- Species: S. parvalis

Binomial name
- Scirpophaga parvalis (Wileman, 1911)

Synonyms
- Schoenobius costalis var. parvalis Wileman, 1911

Species of moth

Scirpophaga parvalis is a moth in the family Crambidae. It was described by Alfred Ernest Wileman in 1911. It is found in China (Heilongjiang, Beijing, Hebei, Shandong, Henan, Shaanxi, Gansu Jiangsu, Anhui, Hubei, Fujian), Japan and Korea.

The wingspan is 20–25 mm for males and 25–31 mm for females.
