= Β-Hexachlorocyclohexane =

β-Hexachlorocyclohexane

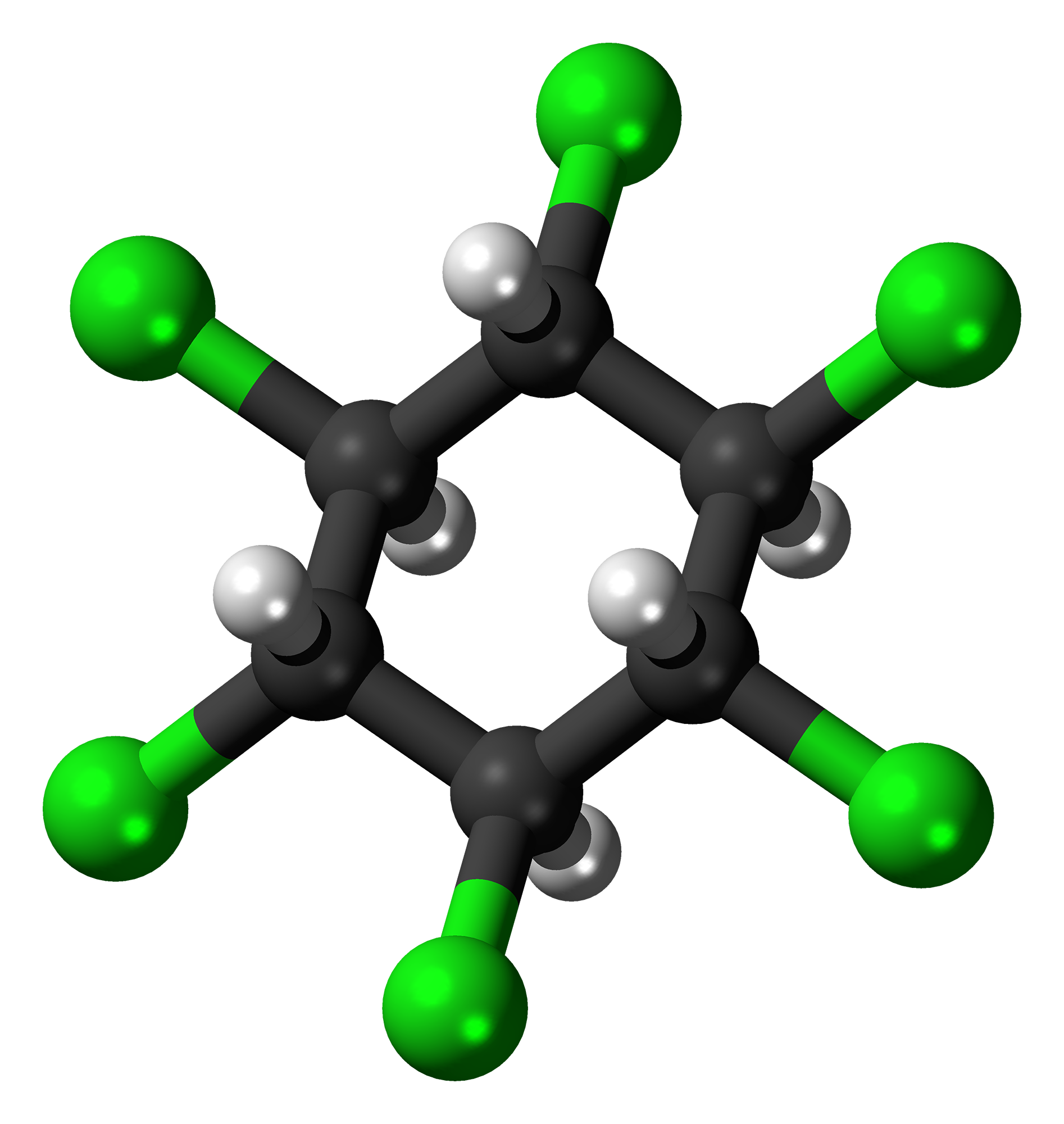

Names
- Preferred IUPAC name (1r,2r,3r,4r,5r,6r)-1,2,3,4,5,6-Hexachlorocyclohexane
- Other names β-HCH β-Benzenehexachloride β-BHC

Identifiers
CAS Number	319-85-7
3D model (JSmol)	Interactive image
Beilstein Reference	1907338
ChEBI	CHEBI:28428
ChEMBL	ChEMBL389022
ChemSpider	10468512
ECHA InfoCard	100.005.703
EC Number	206-271-3
KEGG	C06988
UNII	YM80ODM9PD
CompTox Dashboard (EPA)	DTXSID7020685
- InChI: InChI=1S/C6H6Cl6/c7-1-2(8)4(10)6(12)5(11)3(1)9/h1-6H/t1-,2-,3+,4+,5-,6- Key: JLYXXMFPNIAWKQ-CDRYSYESSA-N; InChI=1/C6H6Cl6/c7-1-2(8)4(10)6(12)5(11)3(1)9/h1-6H/t1-,2-,3+,4+,5-,6- Key: JLYXXMFPNIAWKQ-CDRYSYESBR
- SMILES: Cl[C@H]1[C@H](Cl)[C@@H](Cl)[C@H](Cl)[C@@H](Cl)[C@@H]1Cl

Properties
Chemical formula	C_{6}H_{6}Cl_{6}
Molar mass	290.83 g/mol
- Except where otherwise noted, data are given for materials in their standard state (at 25 °C [77 °F], 100 kPa). verify (what is ?) Infobox references

β-Hexachlorocyclohexane (β-HCH) is an organochloride which is one of the isomers of hexachlorocyclohexane (HCH). It is a byproduct of the production of the insecticide lindane (γ-HCH). It is typically constitutes 5–14% of technical-grade lindane, though it has not been produced or used in the United States since 1985. As of 2009, the Stockholm Convention on Persistent Organic Pollutants classified α-hexachlorocyclohexane and β-HCH as persistent organic pollutants (POPs), due to the chemical's ability to persist in the environment, bioaccumulative, biomagnifying, and long-range transport capacity.

This pesticide was widely used during the 1960s and 1970s, particularly on cotton plants. Although banned as a pesticide more than 30 years ago, traces of beta-HCH can still be found in water and soil. Animal studies show that organochlorine pesticides, including beta-HCH, are neurotoxic, cause oxidative stress, and damage the brain's dopaminergic system. Human studies show that exposure to beta-HCH is linked to Parkinson's and Alzheimer's disease. β-HCH was present in elevated levels in some patients as recently as 2009. It was manufactured by exhausting chlorination of benzene and for this reason was called erroneously β-BHC. This synonym still persists.

In March 2005, the Italian National Monitoring System on Chemical Residuals in Food of Animal Origin detected levels of the pesticide β-HCH that were 20 times higher than the legal limit of 0.003 mg/kg in bulk milk from a dairy farm in the Sacco River valley. β-HCH, a lindane isomer and possible human carcinogen, was subsequently found in milk from several neighboring farms. A study was therefore undertaken to evaluate the extent and risk factors for contamination.

== See also ==
- α-Hexachlorocyclohexane
