= Scirpophaga humilis =

Scientific classification
- Domain: Eukaryota
- Kingdom: Animalia
- Phylum: Arthropoda
- Class: Insecta
- Order: Lepidoptera
- Family: Crambidae
- Genus: Scirpophaga
- Species: S. humilis

Binomial name
- Scirpophaga humilis Wang, Li & Chen, 1986

Species of moth

Scirpophaga humilis is a moth in the family Crambidae. It was described by Wang, Li and Chen in 1986. It is found in China (Jiangsu, Anhui).

The forewings are uniform pale yellow, females with a yellow anal tuft.
