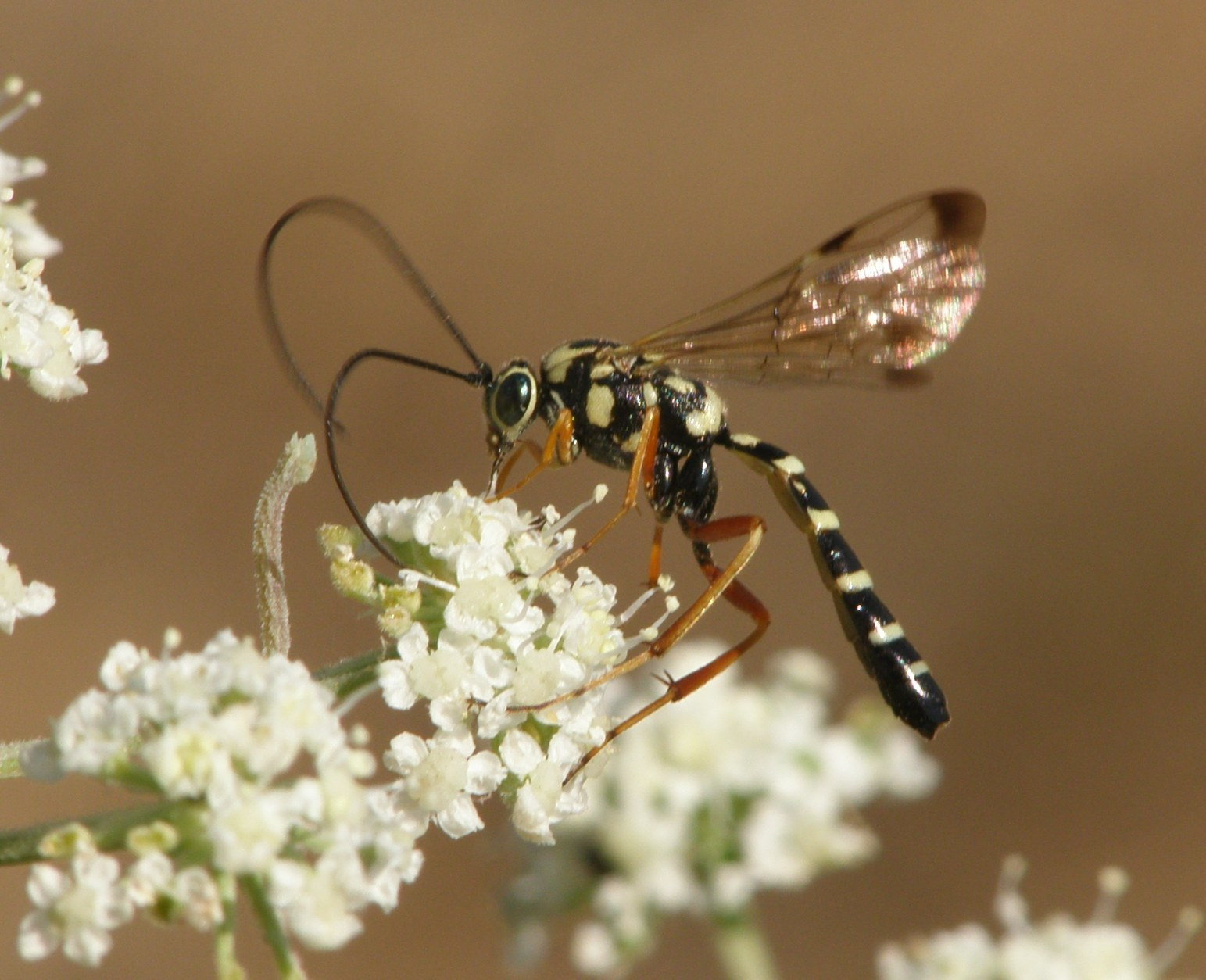
- Syzeuctus irrisorius, Ukraine

Scientific classification
- Kingdom: Animalia
- Phylum: Arthropoda
- Class: Insecta
- Order: Hymenoptera
- Clade: Unicalcarida
- Suborder: Apocrita
- Superfamily: Ichneumonoidea
- Family: Ichneumonidae
- Genus: Syzeuctus; Förster, 1869

Synonyms
- Diceratops Förster, 1869; Syzeucta Thomson, 1889

= Syzeuctus =

Genus of wasps

Syzeuctus is a genus of parasitoid wasps in the family Ichneumonidae. The genus has cosmopolitan distribution. There are more than 130 described species in Syzeuctus.

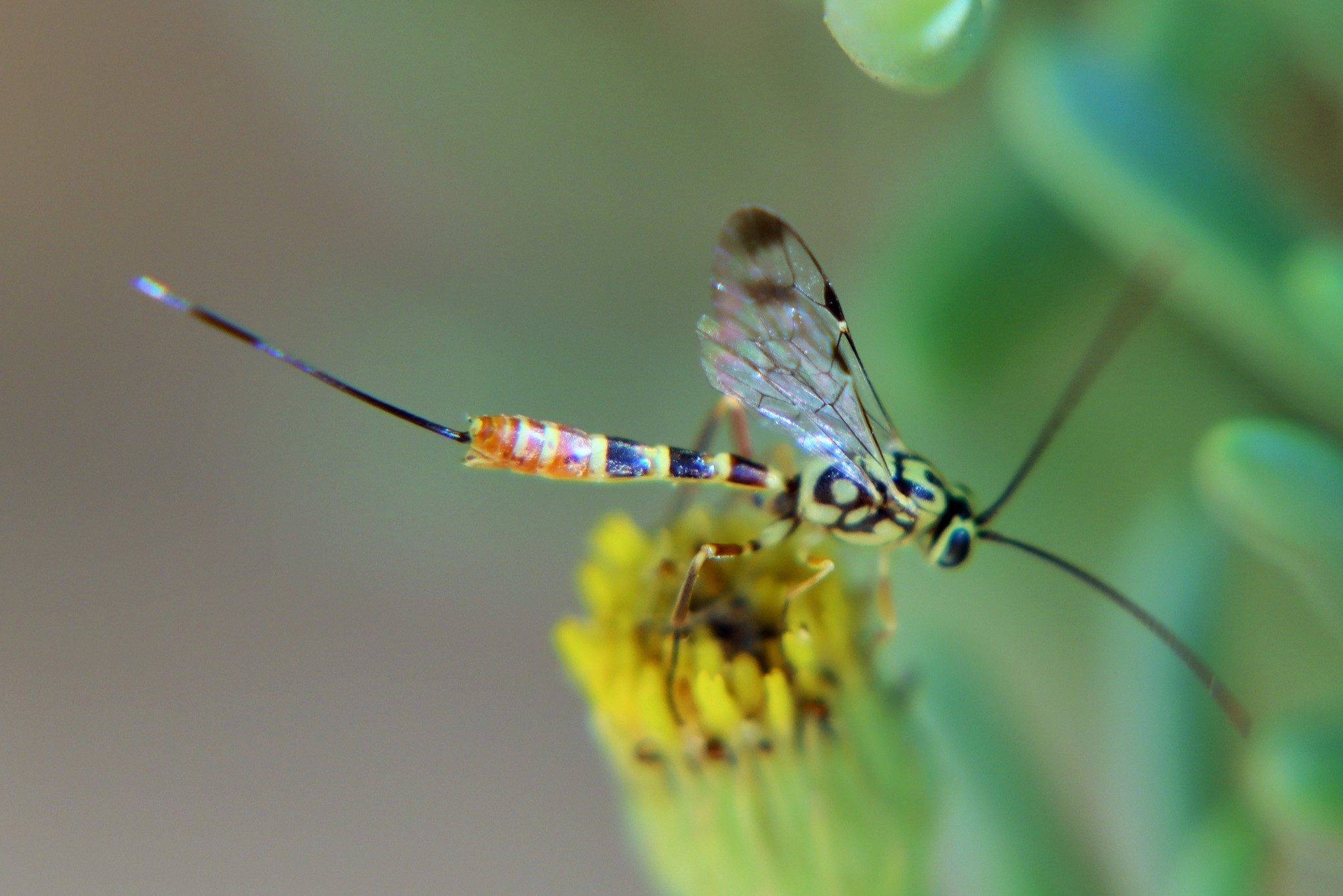
Syzeuctus tigris, Malta

== Species ==
These 138 species belong to the genus Syzeuctus:

- Syzeuctus abonis Ugalde & Gauld, 2002
- Syzeuctus achterbergi Riedel, 2022
- Syzeuctus aequatorialis Benoit, 1959
- Syzeuctus africanus (Cameron, 1904)
- Syzeuctus albopictus Kang, Kolarov & Lee, 2020
- Syzeuctus annulatus (Brulle, 1846)
- Syzeuctus apicifer (Walker, 1874)
- Syzeuctus apicipennis (Cameron, 1902)
- Syzeuctus baezi Ortega, 1989
- Syzeuctus balius Townes, 1978
- Syzeuctus baluchistanensis (Cameron, 1906)
- Syzeuctus besamis Ugalde & Gauld, 2002
- Syzeuctus bicolor Szepligeti, 1899
- Syzeuctus bicornis (Gravenhorst, 1829)
- Syzeuctus brunneomaculatus Riedel, 2021
- Syzeuctus canis Seyrig, 1932
- Syzeuctus capensis (Holmgren, 1868)
- Syzeuctus caper (Seyrig, 1927)
- Syzeuctus catagraphus (Tosquinet, 1896)
- Syzeuctus caudulator Shaumar, 1966
- Syzeuctus ceballosi Seyrig, 1926
- Syzeuctus cenitus Ugalde & Gauld, 2002
- Syzeuctus claripennis (Cameron, 1902)
- Syzeuctus clovis Ugalde & Gauld, 2002
- Syzeuctus comptus (Davis, 1894)
- Syzeuctus conformis Chandra, 1976
- Syzeuctus congoensis (Benoit, 1955)
- Syzeuctus coreanus Uchida, 1928
- Syzeuctus coronatus Townes, 1978
- Syzeuctus crassitarsis Telenga, 1930
- Syzeuctus cribrosimimus Benoit, 1959
- Syzeuctus cribrosoideus Benoit, 1959
- Syzeuctus cribrosus (Kriechbaumer, 1894)
- Syzeuctus curvilineatus (Cameron, 1904)
- Syzeuctus decoratus (Costa, 1890)
- Syzeuctus demitus Ugalde & Gauld, 2002
- Syzeuctus diplolepis Townes, 1978
- Syzeuctus distinctus Benoit, 1959
- Syzeuctus dorcus Ugalde & Gauld, 2002
- Syzeuctus dusmeti Seyrig, 1928
- Syzeuctus electus (Tosquinet, 1896)
- Syzeuctus elegans (Cresson, 1870)
- Syzeuctus elongatus Benoit, 1959
- Syzeuctus ephialtinus Roman, 1910
- Syzeuctus epischniae Cushman, 1926
- Syzeuctus eximius Walley, 1934
- Syzeuctus exsculptus (Fonscolombe, 1854)
- Syzeuctus felis Seyrig, 1932
- Syzeuctus flavator Riedel, 2021
- Syzeuctus flavimargo Meyer, 1926
- Syzeuctus flavitarsis Watanabe & Riedel, 2024
- Syzeuctus flavocephalus Zardouei & Riedel, 2022
- Syzeuctus flavofacialis Kang, Kolarov & Lee, 2020
- Syzeuctus floresiensis Riedel, 2022
- Syzeuctus forpis Ugalde & Gauld, 2002
- Syzeuctus fulvipalpis (Cameron, 1906)
- Syzeuctus fuscator (Panzer, 1809)
- Syzeuctus fuscicornis (Cameron, 1906)
- Syzeuctus galbinus Chandra, 1976
- Syzeuctus gaullei Seyrig, 1932
- Syzeuctus genator Riedel, 2022
- Syzeuctus globiceps Benoit, 1959
- Syzeuctus guatemalensis (Cameron, 1886)
- Syzeuctus heluanensis Schmiedeknecht, 1900
- Syzeuctus helveticus
- Syzeuctus hessei Benoit, 1959
- Syzeuctus hezonicus Ugalde & Gauld, 2002
- Syzeuctus hyalinipennis Szepligeti, 1901
- Syzeuctus iampus Ugalde & Gauld, 2002
- Syzeuctus immedicatus Chandra & Gupta, 1977
- Syzeuctus inaequalis (Fonscolombe, 1854)
- Syzeuctus incompletus Szepligeti, 1908
- Syzeuctus indicus Nikam & Kanhekar, 1987
- Syzeuctus insolitus Chandra, 1976
- Syzeuctus interstitialis (Cameron, 1905)
- Syzeuctus irrisorius (Rossi, 1794)
- Syzeuctus ituriensis Benoit, 1959
- Syzeuctus judtitus Ugalde & Gauld, 2002
- Syzeuctus kasparyator Aubert, 1977
- Syzeuctus kenyensis (Seyrig, 1935)
- Syzeuctus kespius Ugalde & Gauld, 2002
- Syzeuctus kivuensis Benoit, 1959
- Syzeuctus kwiluensis Benoit, 1959
- Syzeuctus lacustris Benoit, 1959
- Syzeuctus laminatus Townes, 1978
- Syzeuctus laoticus Riedel, 2022
- Syzeuctus lemur Seyrig, 1932
- Syzeuctus leo (Seyrig, 1926)
- Syzeuctus leptopunctatus Chandra & Gupta, 1977
- Syzeuctus lineaticeps (Cameron, 1906)
- Syzeuctus longiceps Benoit, 1959
- Syzeuctus longigenus Uchida, 1940
- Syzeuctus longivalvator Aubert, 1977
- Syzeuctus lurinus Ugalde & Gauld, 2002
- Syzeuctus macrospiracularis Momoi, 1971
- Syzeuctus maculipennis (Costa, 1883)
- Syzeuctus marshalli (Cameron, 1906)
- Syzeuctus meridionalis Benoit, 1959
- Syzeuctus minasensis (Brethes, 1927)
- Syzeuctus movicus Ugalde & Gauld, 2002
- Syzeuctus multipictus (Saussure, 1892)
- Syzeuctus nagzirae Nikam & Kanhekar, 1987
- Syzeuctus namaquensis Benoit, 1959
- Syzeuctus nanus Benoit, 1959
- Syzeuctus orientalis Riedel, 2022
- Syzeuctus pallidator Aubert, 1966
- Syzeuctus paraturcator Riedel, 2021
- Syzeuctus peringueyi (Cameron, 1905)
- Syzeuctus persicus Riedel, 2021
- Syzeuctus petiolaris (Gravenhorst, 1829)
- Syzeuctus possitus Ugalde & Gauld, 2002
- Syzeuctus pseudoceballosi Riedel, 2021
- Syzeuctus puberulus (Kriechbaumer, 1895)
- Syzeuctus robustor Aubert, 1978
- Syzeuctus rodhaini Benoit, 1959
- Syzeuctus rostratus (Cameron, 1906)
- Syzeuctus ruberrimus Benoit, 1959
- Syzeuctus rufiapicalis Watanabe & Riedel, 2024
- Syzeuctus sambonis Uchida, 1928
- Syzeuctus senegalensis Benoit, 1959
- Syzeuctus siamensis Riedel, 2022
- Syzeuctus spec Aubert, 1977
- Syzeuctus speciosus (Girault, 1925)
- Syzeuctus spilostoma (Cameron, 1905)
- Syzeuctus szilagysagiensis Kiss, 1926
- Syzeuctus takaozanus Uchida, 1928
- Syzeuctus tanycorpus Chandra, 1976
- Syzeuctus tenuifasciatus Schmiedeknecht, 1900
- Syzeuctus tigris Seyrig, 1926
- Syzeuctus tonganus (Kriechbaumer, 1894)
- Syzeuctus torrevillasi Momoi, 1971
- Syzeuctus tricolor Szepligeti, 1908
- Syzeuctus turcator Aubert, 1984
- Syzeuctus vedoris Ugalde & Gauld, 2002
- Syzeuctus vigil (Tosquinet, 1900)
- Syzeuctus villosus (Cameron, 1899)
- Syzeuctus zairensis Benoit, 1959
- Syzeuctus zanthorius (Cameron, 1902)
