= Lindane =

Organochlorine chemical and an isomer of hexachlorocyclohexane

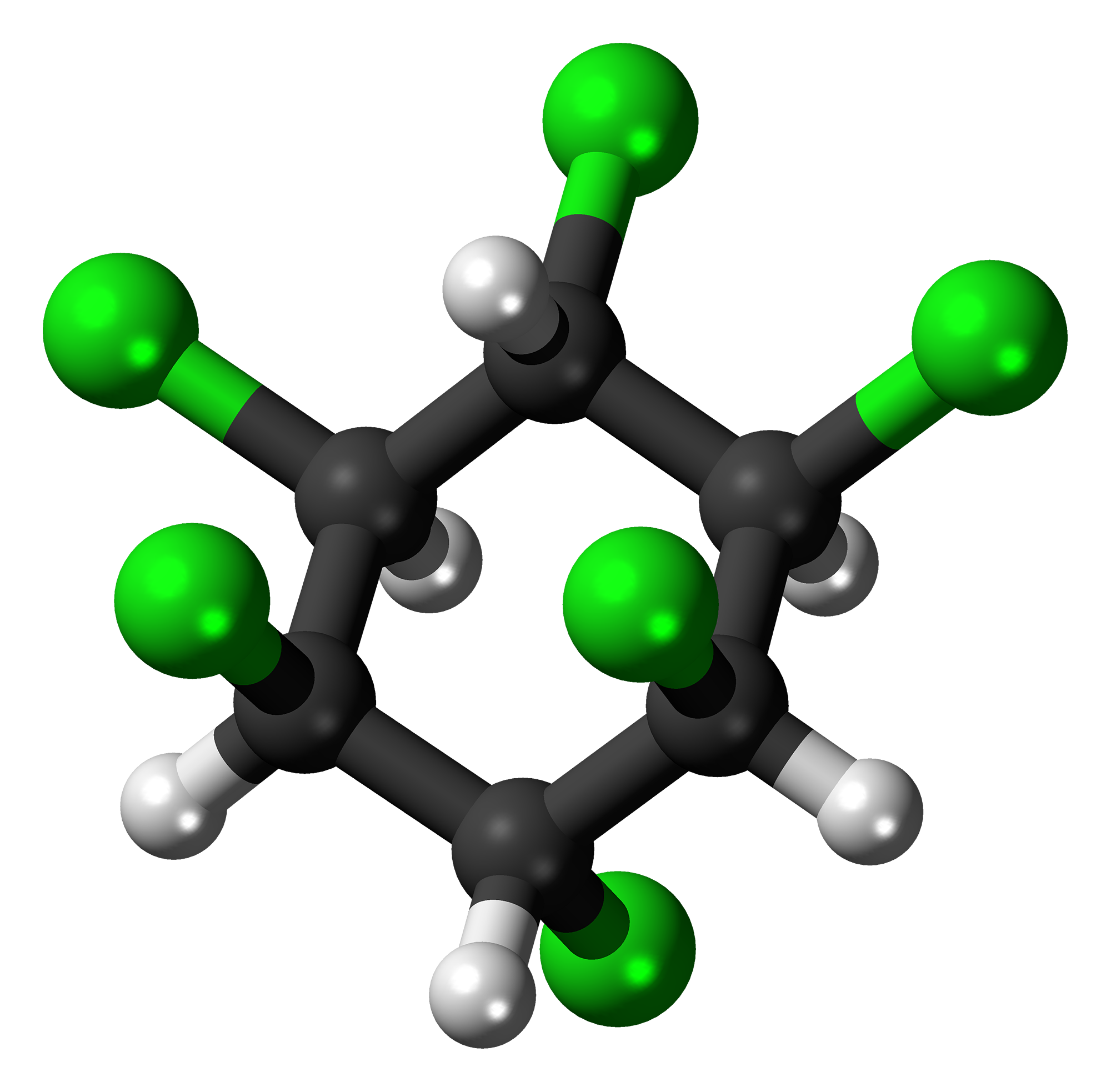

Clinical data
- AHFS/Drugs.com: Monograph
- MedlinePlus: a682651
- Pregnancy category: C
- Routes of administration: Topical
- ATC code: P03AB02 (WHO) QS02QA01 (WHO) QP53AB52 (WHO)

Legal status
- Legal status: Production and agricultural use is banned in the 182 countries that are Parties to the Stockholm Convention, but pharmaceutical use is allowed as a second-line treatment for scabies and lice

Pharmacokinetic data
- Protein binding: 91%
- Metabolism: Hepatic cytochrome P-450 oxygenase system
- Elimination half-life: 18 hours

Identifiers
- IUPAC name: (1r,2R,3S,4r,5R,6S)-1,2,3,4,5,6-hexachlorocyclohexane
- CAS Number: 58-89-9
- PubChem CID: 727
- DrugBank: DB00431
- ChemSpider: 10481896
- UNII: 59NEE7PCAB
- KEGG: C07075
- ChEBI: CHEBI:32888
- ChEMBL: ChEMBL15891
- CompTox Dashboard (EPA): DTXSID2020686
- ECHA InfoCard: 100.000.365

Chemical and physical data
- Formula: C_{6}H_{6}Cl_{6}
- Molar mass: 290.81 g·mol^{−1}
- 3D model (JSmol): Interactive image
- SMILES: Cl[C@H]1[C@H](Cl)[C@@H](Cl)[C@@H](Cl)[C@H](Cl)[C@H]1Cl
- InChI: InChI=1S/C6H6Cl6/c7-1-2(8)4(10)6(12)5(11)3(1)9/h1-6H/t1-,2-,3-,4+,5+,6+; Key:JLYXXMFPNIAWKQ-GNIYUCBRSA-N

Lindane, also known as gamma-hexachlorocyclohexane (γ-HCH), gammaxene, Gammallin and benzene hexachloride (BHC), is an organochlorine chemical and an isomer of hexachlorocyclohexane that has been used both as an agricultural insecticide and as a pharmaceutical treatment for lice and scabies.

Lindane is a neurotoxin that interferes with GABA neurotransmitter function by interacting with the GABA_{A} receptor-chloride channel complex at the picrotoxin binding site. In humans, lindane affects the nervous system, liver, and kidneys, and may well be a carcinogen. Whether lindane is an endocrine disruptor is unclear.

The World Health Organization classifies lindane as "moderately hazardous", and its international trade is restricted and regulated under the Rotterdam Convention on Prior Informed Consent. In 2009, the production and agricultural use of lindane was banned under the Stockholm Convention on persistent organic pollutants. A specific exemption to that ban allows it to continue to be used as a second-line pharmaceutical treatment for lice and scabies.

== History and use ==
The chemical was originally synthesized in 1825 by Faraday. It is named after the Dutch chemist Teunis van der Linden (1884–1965), the first to isolate and describe γ-hexachlorcyclohexane in 1912. The fact that mixtures of isomers of hexachlorocyclohexane have insecticidal activity is a case of multiple discovery. Work in the 1930s at the Jealott's Hill laboratories of Imperial Chemical Industries Ltd (ICI) led in 1942 to the realization that the γ isomer was the key active component in the mixture which had hitherto been tested. Development work in the UK was accelerated because at that time in World War II imports of derris containing the insecticide rotenone were restricted owing to the Japanese occupation of Malaya and alternatives were urgently needed. In trials in 1943 it was found that a five-fold increase in the yield of oats and wheat was achieved using a dust formulation of the available material, owing to its efficacy against wireworm pests. By the end of 1945, γ-hexachlorcyclohexane of 98% purity became available and ICI commercialised a seed treatment launched in 1949 as Mergamma A, containing 1% mercury and 20% lindane. Subsequently, lindane has been used to treat food crops and forestry products, as a seed or soil treatment, and to treat livestock and pets. It was used as a household pesticide as the active pesticide ingredient of an insecticidal floor wax product called "Freewax". It has also been used as pharmaceutical treatment for lice and scabies, formulated as a shampoo or lotion. Between 1950 and 2000, an estimated 600,000 tonnes of lindane were produced globally, and the vast majority of which was used in agriculture. It has been manufactured by several countries, including the United States, China, Brazil, and several European countries. By November 2006, the use of lindane had been banned in 52 countries and restricted in 33 others. Seventeen countries, including the US and Canada, allowed either limited agricultural or pharmaceutical use. In 2009, an international ban on the use of lindane in agriculture was implemented under the Stockholm Convention on Persistent Organic Pollutants. A specific exemption allows for it to continue to be used in second-line treatments for the head lice and scabies for five more years. The production of the lindane isomers α- and β-hexachlorocyclohexane was also banned. Although the US has not ratified the convention, it has similarly banned agricultural uses while still allowing its use as a second-line lice and scabies treatment.

=== United States ===
In the US, lindane pesticide products were regulated by the U.S. Environmental Protection Agency (EPA), while lindane medications are regulated by the Food and Drug Administration (FDA). It was registered as an agricultural insecticide in the 1940s, and as pharmaceutical in 1951. The EPA gradually began restricting its agricultural use in the 1970s due to concerns over its effects on human health and the environment. By 2002, its use was limited to seed treatments for just six crops, and in 2007, these last uses were cancelled.

==== Pharmaceutical uses ====
Lindane medications continue to be available in the US, though since 1995, they have been designated "second-line" treatments, meaning they should be prescribed when other "first-line" treatments have failed or cannot be used. In December 2007, the FDA sent a Warning Letter to Morton Grove Pharmaceuticals, the sole U.S. manufacturer of lindane products, requesting that the company correct misleading information on two of its lindane websites. The letter said, in part, that the materials "are misleading in that they omit and/or minimize the most serious and important risk information associated with the use of Lindane Shampoo, particularly in pediatric patients; include a misleading dosing claim; and overstate the efficacy of Lindane Shampoo."

California banned the pharmaceutical use of lindane effective 2002, and the Michigan House of Representatives passed a bill in 2009 to restrict its use to doctors' offices. A recent analysis of the California ban concluded that a majority of pediatricians had not experienced problems treating lice or scabies since that ban took effect. The study also documented a marked decrease in lindane wastewater contamination and a dramatic decline in lindane poisoning incidents reported to poison control centers. The authors concluded, "The California experience suggests elimination of pharmaceutical lindane produced environmental benefits, was associated with a reduction in reported unintentional exposures and did not adversely affect head lice and scabies treatment."

The Persistent Organic Pollutants Review Committee of the Stockholm Convention on Persistent Organic Pollutants considers the use of lindane in agriculture as largely redundant, with other, less toxic and less persistent pesticides. In the case of pharmaceutical use, the committee noted, "alternatives for pharmaceutical uses have often failed for scabies and lice treatment and the number of available alternative products for this use is scarce. For this particular case, a reasonable alternative would be to use lindane as a second-line treatment when other treatments fail, while potential new treatments are assessed."

== Other uses ==
=== Pest repellent ===
Lindane is a bird repellent. Rudd & Genelly 1954 noticed that bird pests seemed uninterested in treated seeds, specifically pheasants and blackbirds around Davis, CA, US. They tested its repellent effect on pheasants and found it effective, speculating that it may be usable as a general bird repellent.

== Synthesis ==
Lindane is not known to occur naturally. Hexachlorocyclohexane (HCH) was discovered in 1825. Its insecticidal properties were not known until the 1940s. Technical grade HCH, as a mixture of isomers is synthesized from benzene and chlorine in presence of ultraviolet light. The resulting product mixture comprises 65-70% α-HCH, 7-10% β-HCH, 14-15% lindane (γ-HCH), approximately 7% δ-HCH, 1-2% ε-HCH, and 1-2% other components.

It can also be prepared by exposing a mixture of benzene and chlorine to alpha radiation.

== Human health effects ==
The EPA and WHO both classify lindane as "moderately" acutely toxic. It has an oral LD_{50} of 88 mg/kg in rats and a dermal LD_{50} of 1000 mg/kg. Most of the adverse human health effects reported for lindane have been related to agricultural uses and chronic, occupational exposure of seed-treatment workers.

Exposure to large amounts of lindane can harm the nervous system, producing a range of symptoms from headache and dizziness to seizures, convulsions, and more rarely, death. Lindane has not been shown to affect the immune system in humans, and it is not considered to be genotoxic. Prenatal exposure to β-HCH, an isomer of lindane and production byproduct, has been associated with altered thyroid hormone levels and could affect brain development.

The Occupational Safety and Health Administration and National Institute for Occupational Safety and Health have set occupational exposure limits (permissible exposure and recommended exposure, respectively) for lindane at 0.5 mg/m^{3} at a time-weighted average of eight hours for skin exposure. People can be exposed to lindane in the workplace by inhaling it, absorbing it through their skin, swallowing it, and eye contact. At levels of 50 mg/m^{3}, lindane is immediately dangerous to life and health.

It is classified as an extremely hazardous substance in the United States as defined in section 302 of the U.S. Emergency Planning and Community Right-to-Know Act (42 U.S.C. 11002), and is subject to strict reporting requirements by facilities which produce, store, or use it in significant quantities.

=== Cancer risk ===
Based primarily on evidence from animal studies, most evaluations of lindane have concluded that it may possibly cause cancer. In 2015, the International Agency for Research on Cancer classified lindane as a known human carcinogen, and in 2001 the EPA concluded there was "suggestive evidence of carcinogenicity, but not sufficient to assess human carcinogenic potential." The U.S. Department of Health and Human Services determined that all isomers of hexachlorocyclohexane, including lindane, "may reasonably be anticipated to cause cancer in humans," and in 1999, the EPA characterized the evidence carcinogenicity for lindane as "suggestive ... of carcinogenicity, but not sufficient to assess human carcinogenic potential." Lindane and its isomers have also been on California's Proposition 65 list of known carcinogens since 1989. In contrast, the World Health Organization concluded in 2004 that "lindane is not likely to pose a carcinogenic risk to humans." India's BIS considers Lindane a "confirmed carcinogen".

=== Adverse reactions ===
A variety of adverse reactions to lindane pharmaceuticals have been reported, ranging from skin irritation to seizures, and, in rare instances, death. The most common side effects are burning sensations, itching, dryness, and rash. While serious effects are rare and have most often resulted from misuse, adverse reactions have occurred when used properly. The FDA, therefore, requires a so-called black box warning on lindane products, which explains the risks of lindane products and their proper use.

The black box warning emphasizes that lindane should not be used on premature infants and individuals with known uncontrolled seizure disorders, and should be used with caution in infants, children, the elderly, and individuals with other skin conditions (e.g., dermatitis, psoriasis) and people who weigh less than 110 lb (50 kg), as they may be at risk of serious neurotoxicity.

== Environmental contamination ==
Lindane is a persistent organic pollutant: it is relatively long-lived in the environment, it is transported long distances by natural processes like global distillation, and it can bioaccumulate in food chains, though it is rapidly eliminated when exposure is discontinued.

The production and agricultural use of lindane are the primary causes of environmental contamination, and levels of lindane in the environment have been decreasing in the U.S., consistent with decreasing agricultural usage patterns. The production of lindane generates large amounts of waste hexachlorocyclohexane isomers, and "every ton of lindane manufactured produces about nine tons of toxic waste." Modern manufacturing standards for lindane involve the treatment and conversion of waste isomers to less toxic molecules, a process known as "cracking".

When lindane is used in agriculture, an estimated 12–30% of it volatilizes into the atmosphere, where it is subject to long-range transport and can be deposited by rainfall. Lindane in soil can leach to surface and even ground water, and can bioaccumulate in the food chain. However, biotransformation and elimination are relatively rapid when exposure is discontinued. Most exposure of the general population to lindane has resulted from agricultural uses and the intake of foods, such as produce, meats, and milk, produced from treated agricultural commodities. Human exposure has decreased significantly since the cancellation of agricultural uses in 2006. Even so, the CDC published in 2005 its Third National Report on Human Exposures to Environmental Chemicals, which found no detectable amounts of lindane in human blood taken from a random sampling of about 5,000 people in the US as part of the NHANES study (National Health and Nutrition Examination Survey. The lack of detection of lindane in this large human "biomonitoring" study likely reflects the increasingly limited agricultural uses of lindane over the last two decades. The cancellation of agricultural uses in the United States will further reduce the amount of lindane introduced into the environment by more than 99%.

Over time, lindane is broken down in soil, sediment, and water into less harmful substances by algae, fungi, and bacteria; however, the process is relatively slow and dependent on ambient environmental conditions. Lindane residues in honey and beeswax are reported to be the highest of any historical or current pesticide and to continue to pose a threat to honeybee health. The ecological impact of lindane's environmental persistence continues to be debated.

The US EPA determined in 2002 that the agency does not believe that lindane contaminates drinking water in excess of levels considered safe. U.S. Geological Survey teams concluded the same in 1999 and 2000. With regard to lindane medications, the EPA conducted "down-the-drain" estimates of the amount of lindane reaching public water supplies and concluded that lindane levels from pharmaceutical sources were "extremely low" and not of concern.

Note that the EPA has set the maximum contaminant level or "MCL" for lindane allowed in public water supplies and considered safe for drinking at 200 parts per trillion (ppt). By comparison, the state of California imposes a lower MCL for lindane of 19 ppt. However, the California standard is based on a dated 1988 national water criterion that was subsequently revised by the EPA in 2003 to 980 ppt. The EPA stated that the change resulted from "significant scientific advances made in the last two decades particularly in the areas of cancer and noncancer risk assessments." While the EPA considered raising the MCL standard for lindane to 980 ppt at that time, the change was never implemented because states had little difficulty in maintaining lindane levels below the 200 ppt MCL limit already in place. Today, the legally enforceable MCL standard for lindane is 200 ppt, while the national water criterion for lindane is 980 ppt.

=== Isomers ===
Lindane is the gamma isomer of hexachlorocyclohexane ("γ-HCH"). In addition to the issue of lindane pollution, some concerns are related to the other isomers of HCH, namely alpha-HCH and beta-HCH, which are notably more toxic than lindane, lack its insecticidal properties, and are byproducts of lindane production. In the 1940s and 1950s, lindane producers stockpiled these isomers in open heaps, which led to ground and water contamination. The International HCH and Pesticide Forum has since been established to bring together experts to address the clean-up and containment of these sites. Modern manufacturing standards for lindane involve the treatment and conversion of waste isomers to less toxic industrial chemicals, a process known as "cracking". Today, only a few production plants remain active worldwide to accommodate public-health uses of lindane and declining agricultural needs. Lindane has not been manufactured in the U.S. since the mid-1970s, but continues to be imported.

α-hexachlorocyclohexane

β-hexachlorocyclohexane

== See also ==
- Benzene hexachloride (disambiguation)
