= Hexachlorocyclohexane =

Chemical compound

Hexachlorocyclohexane (HCH), C_{6}H_{6}Cl_{6}, is any of several polyhalogenated organic compounds consisting of a six-carbon ring with one chlorine and one hydrogen attached to each carbon. This structure has nine stereoisomers (eight diastereomers - one which has two enantiomers, and seven which are meso compounds), which differ by the stereochemistry of the individual chlorine substituents on the cyclohexane. It is sometimes erroneously called "benzene hexachloride" (BHC). They have been used as models for analyzing the effects of different geometric positions of the large atoms with dipolar bonds on the stability of the cyclohexane conformation. The isomers are poisonous, pesticidal, and persistent organic pollutants, to varying degrees.

Hexachlorocyclohexane was dimerized to produce mirex, a banned pesticide.

Common forms are:

- alpha-hexachlorocyclohexane, α-HCH, or α-BHC (CAS RN: 319-84-6 ), the optically active isomer
- beta-hexachlorocyclohexane, β-HCH, or β-BHC (CAS RN: 319-85-7 )
- gamma-hexachlorocyclohexane, γ-HCH, γ-BHC, or lindane (CAS RN: 58-89-9 ), the most insecticidal isomer
- delta-hexachlorocyclohexane, δ-HCH, or δ-BHC (CAS RN: 319-86-8 )
- technical hexachlorocyclohexane, t-HCH, or t-BHC (CAS RN: 608-73-1 ), a mixture of isomers
α-Hexachlorocyclohexane, the dextrorotatory enantiomer

α-Hexachlorocyclohexane, the levorotatory enantiomer

β-Hexachlorocyclohexane

γ-Hexachlorocyclohexane, lindane

δ-Hexachlorocyclohexane

ε-Hexachlorocyclohexane

ζ-Hexachlorocyclohexane

η-Hexachlorocyclohexane

θ-Hexachlorocyclohexane

Chlorination of benzene under electrophilic aromatic substitution conditions (Cl_{2}/FeCl_{3} or Cl_{2}/AlCl_{3}) produces chlorobenzene. Since mono chloro-de-hydrogenation deactivates the molecule against further electrophilic reactions, the reaction can be halted at one chlorine atom substitution.

Electrophilic chlorination: C_{6}H_{6} + Cl_{2} → C_{6}H_{5}Cl + HCl

In contrast, chlorination of benzene under radical addition conditions (Cl_{2}, hν (photochlorination) or Cl_{2}, Δ, high P) yields hexachlorocyclohexane isomers after three successive radical dichlorination steps. Addition rather than substitution takes place, due to the very high C–H bond dissociation energy (112 kcal/mol) that disfavors abstraction of a hydrogen atom. Addition of Cl_{2} destroys the aromaticity of the benzene ring, and the addition of two more Cl_{2} molecules is rapid compared to the first. Hence, only thrice-dichlorinated product can be isolated from this reaction.

Radical addition: C_{6}H_{6} + 3Cl_{2} → C_{6}H_{6}Cl_{6}

Hexachlorocyclohexane isomers with more than one chlorine atom per carbon are:

- 1,1,2,3,4,5-hexachlorocyclohexane
- 1,1,2,3,4,6-hexachlorocyclohexane
- 1,1,2,3,5,6-hexachlorocyclohexane
- 1,1,2,2,3,4-hexachlorocyclohexane
- 1,1,2,2,3,5-hexachlorocyclohexane
- 1,1,2,2,3,6-hexachlorocyclohexane
- 1,1,2,2,4,5-hexachlorocyclohexane
- 1,1,2,3,3,4-hexachlorocyclohexane
- 1,1,2,3,3,5-hexachlorocyclohexane
- 1,1,2,3,4,4-hexachlorocyclohexane
- 1,1,2,4,4,5-hexachlorocyclohexane
- 1,1,2,4,4,6-hexachlorocyclohexane
- 1,1,2,4,5,5-hexachlorocyclohexane
- 1,1,2,5,6,6-hexachlorocyclohexane
- 1,1,2,2,3,3-hexachlorocyclohexane
- 1,1,2,2,4,4-hexachlorocyclohexane
- 1,1,3,3,5,5-hexachlorocyclohexane

== See also ==
- Hexachlorobenzene - benzene derivative with one chlorine and no hydrogens bound to each carbon atom
- Inositol / Cyclohexane-1,2,3,4,5,6-hexol - cyclohexane derivatives with one hydroxyl bound to each carbon atom
