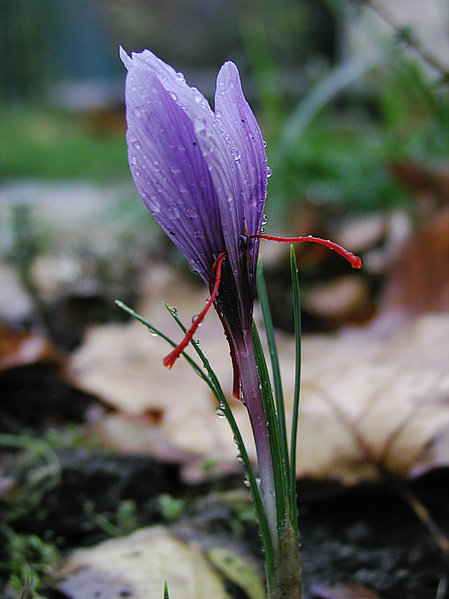
- Crocus sativus

Scientific classification
- Kingdom: Plantae
- Clade: Tracheophytes
- Clade: Angiosperms
- Clade: Monocots
- Order: Asparagales
- Family: Iridaceae
- Subfamily: Crocoideae
- Tribe: Ixieae
- Genus: Crocus; L.

Type species
- Crocus sativus L.

Sections
- Crocus; Nudiscapus

Synonyms
- Safran Medik.; Geanthus Raf.; Crociris Schur

= List of Crocus species =

Crocus

This list of Crocus species shows the accepted species names within the genus Crocus, which are predominantly spring perennial plants in the Iridaceae (iris) family. The list of species is arranged by section. Estimates of the number of species in Crocus have varied widely, from anywhere between 80 and 160, even in the modern era.

Carl Linnaeus originally included two species in 1753, but new species continue to be identified. The deep phylogenetic infrageneric relationships remain unresolved. When subjected to molecular phylogenetic analysis, the sections are well supported but only some of the series. Ongoing, more detailed examination of the various series is leading to a recircumscription, with increasing monophyly. Species segregate to form a basal polytomy of four subclades (A–D). The first clade (A) corresponding to section Crocus, but including C. sieberi and several closely related species (originally included in section Nudiscapus series Reticulati). The remaining three clades (B-D) include all the remaining species of section Nudiscapus. Of these, B and C are small, corresponding to series Orientales and Carpetani respectively, with all remaining series in the large D clade.

== Sections, series and species ==
Classification of Brian Mathew (1982), amended 2009 and including more recent additions. Series marked with * indicate those known to be monophyletic.

=== Section Crocus B.Mathew (Clade A) ===
Species with a basal prophyll. Type species C. sativus L.

==== *Series Verni B.Mathew ====
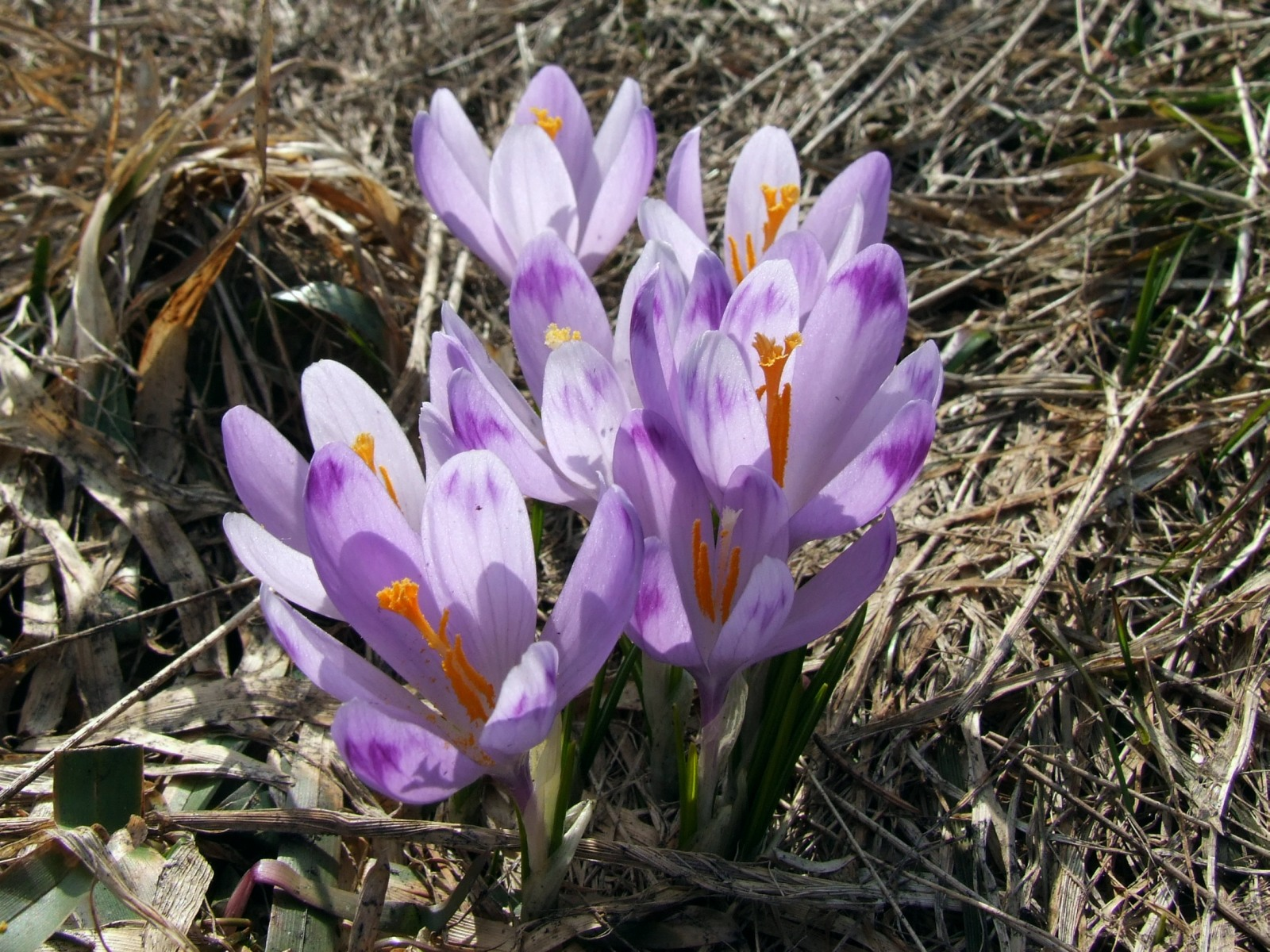
Crocus vernus

- Type species C. vernus (L.) Hill: corms with reticulated fibers, spring-flowering (apart from Crocus longiflorus), flowers for the most part without conspicuous outer striping, bracts absent

- Crocus bertiscensis Raca, Harpke, Shuka & V. Randjel.
- Crocus etruscus Parl.
- Crocus heuffelianus Herb.
- Crocus ilvensis Peruzzi & Carta
- Crocus kosaninii Pulevic
- Crocus longiflorus Raf. – Italian crocus (formerly in Series Longiflori)
- Crocus neapolitanus (Ker Gawl.) Loisel.
- Crocus neglectus Peruzzi and Carta
- Crocus siculus Tineo ex Guss.
- Crocus tommasinianus Herb. – Woodland crocus, Tommasini's crocus
- Crocus vernus (L.) Hill (=C. sativus var. vernus L.; C. vernus sensu stricto ) – Spring crocus, Dutch crocus

==== *Series Baytopi B.Mathew ====
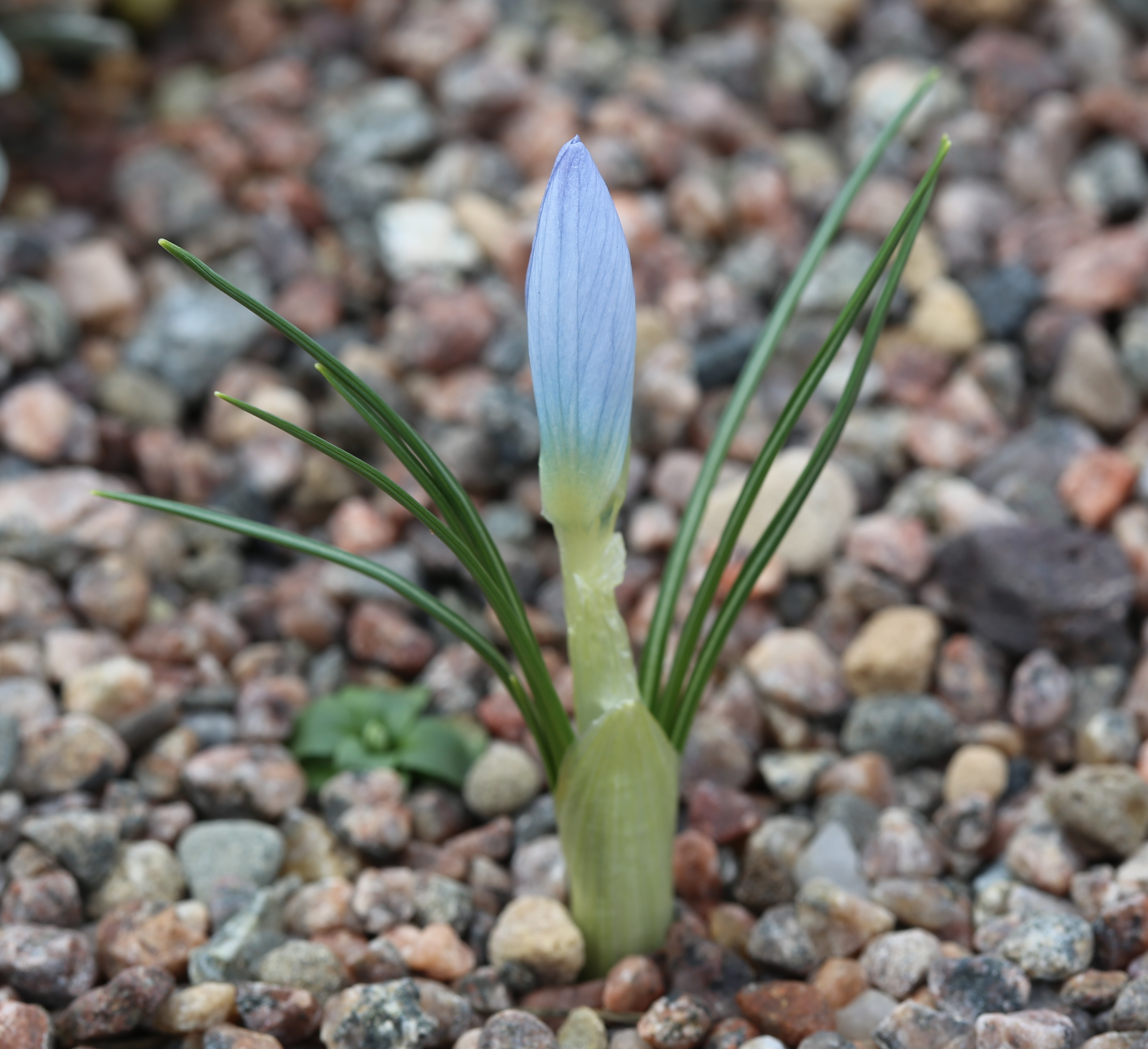
Crocus baytopiorum

- (new Series) Type species Crocus baytopiorum: corms with strongly reticulated fibers; leaves numerous, narrowly linear; spring-flowering, bracts absent; anthers extrorsely dehiscent

- Crocus baytopiorum Mathew (formerly in Series Verni)

==== *Series Scardici B.Mathew ====
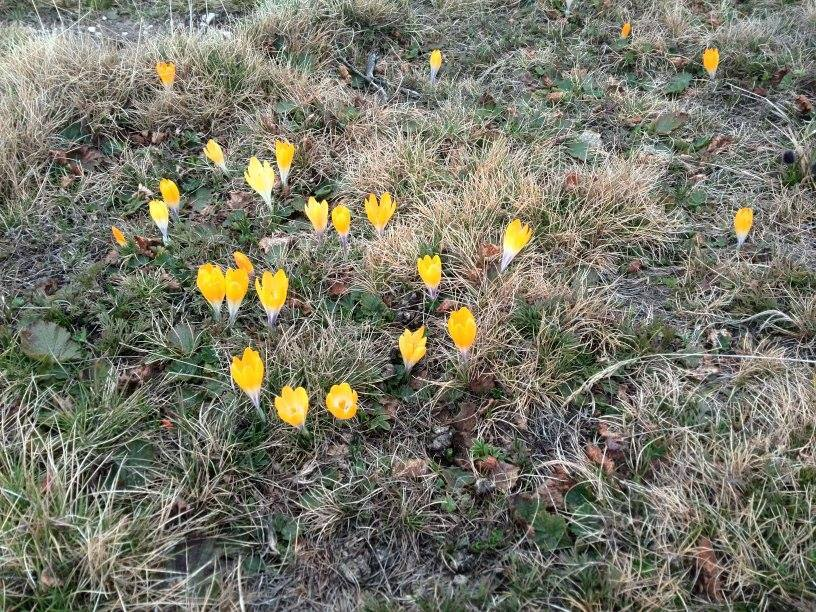
Crocus scardicus

- Type species Crocus scardicus: spring-flowering, leaves have no pale stripe on the upper surface

- Crocus pelistericus Pulevic
- Crocus scardicus Kos.

==== Series Versicolores B.Mathew ====
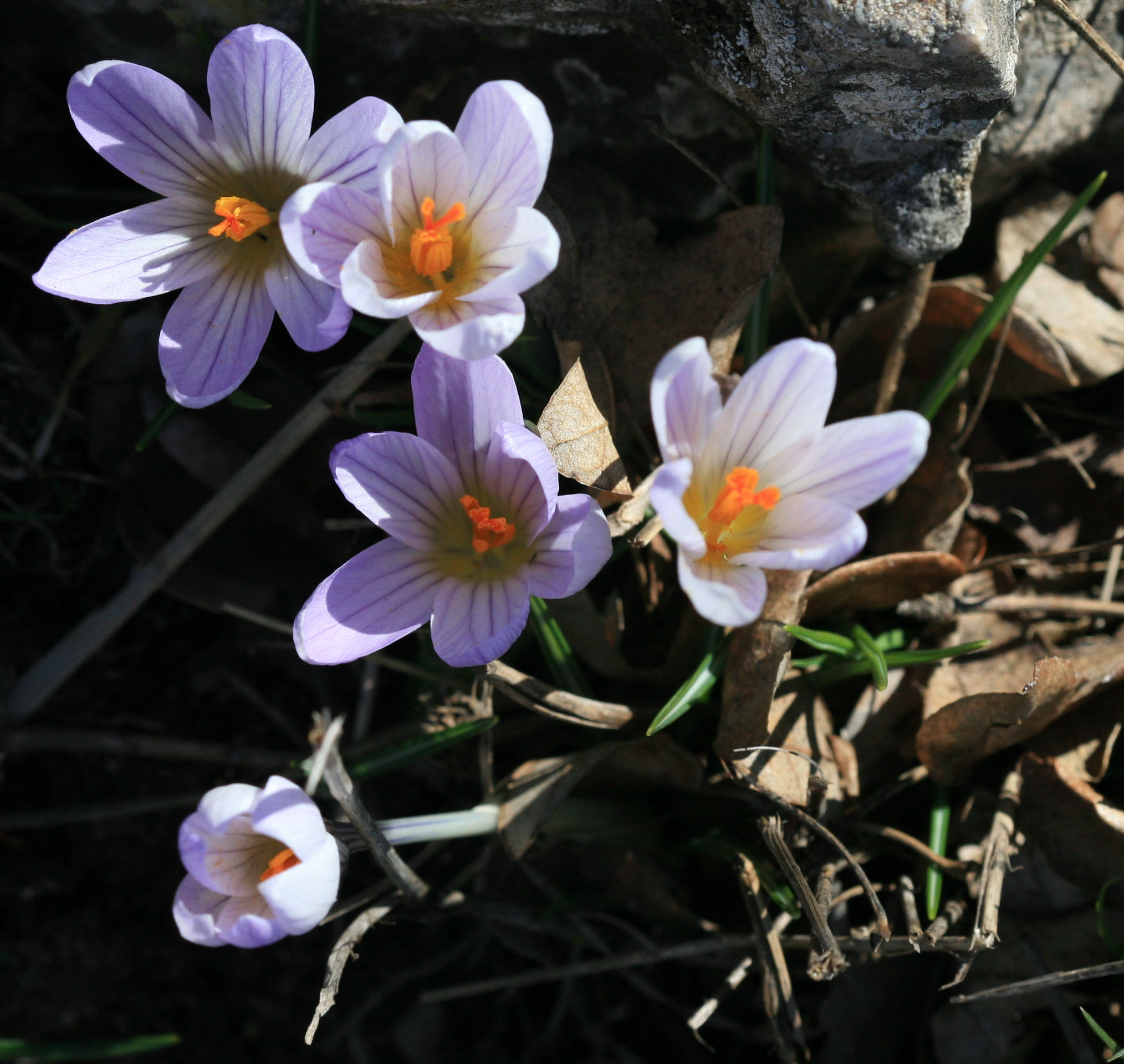
Crocus versicolor

- Type species Crocus versicolor: : spring-flowering, corms with tunics, which for the most part have parallel fibers, flowers with conspicuous exterior striping

- Crocus cambessedesii J. Gay
- Crocus versicolor Ker Gawl. – cloth-of-silver crocus
- Crocus corsicus Vanucchi ex Maw
- Crocus imperati Ten.
  - Crocus imperati subsp. imperati
  - Crocus imperati subsp. suaveolens (Bertol.) B.Mathew
- Crocus minimus DC.

==== *Series Kotschyani B.Mathew ====
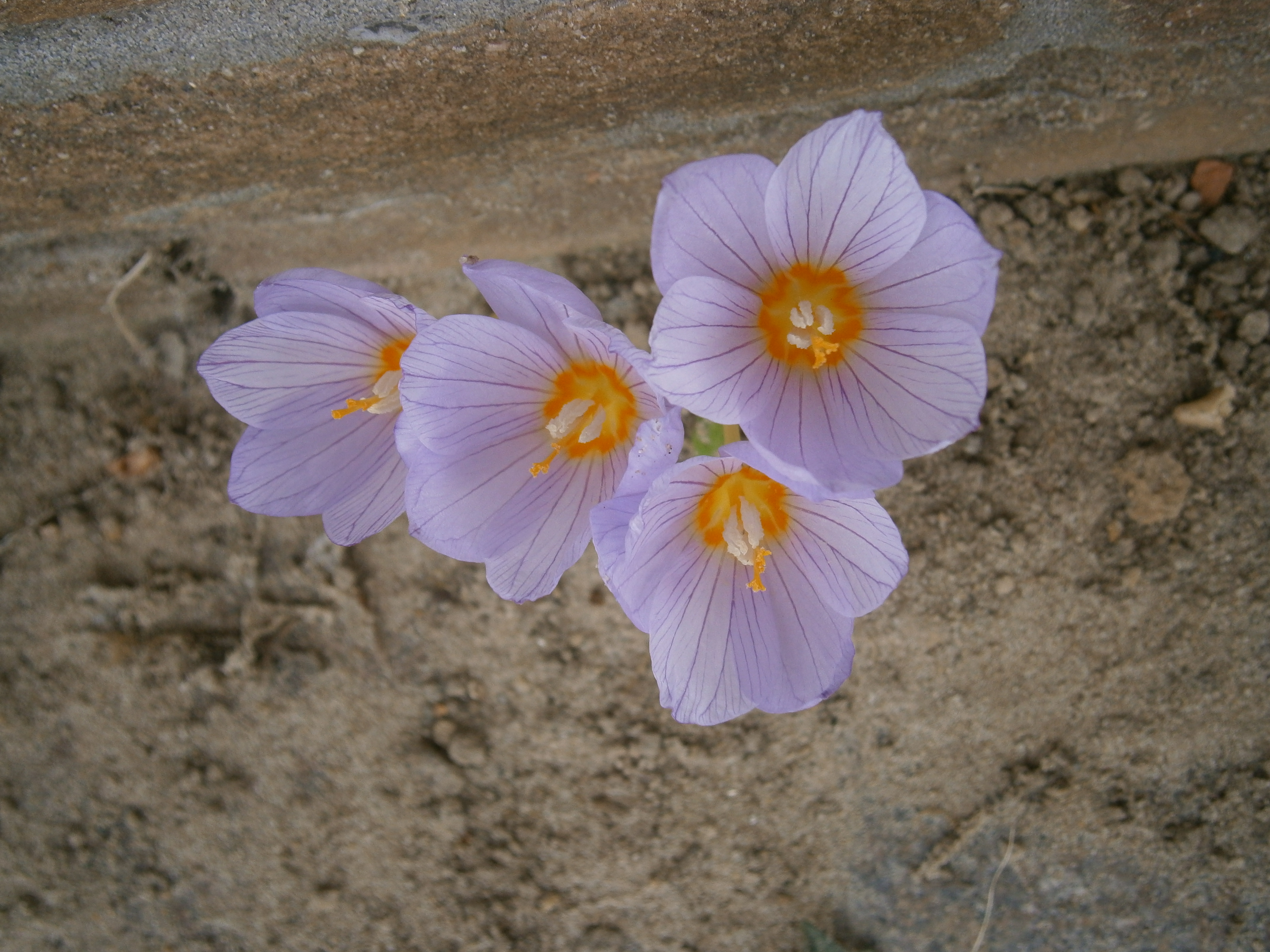
Crocus kotschyanus

- Type species Crocus kotschyanus: : autumn-flowering, anthers white, styles for the most part three-forked

- Crocus autranii Albov.
- Crocus gilanicus B. Matthew (discovered in 1973 and named after Gilan province in Iran where it was first found)
- Crocus karduchorum Kotschy ex Maw
- Crocus kotschyanus K. Koch – Kotschy's crocus (syn. C. zonatus)
  - Crocus kotschyanus subsp. cappadocicus B.Mathew
  - Crocus kotschyanus subsp. hakkariensis B.Mathew
  - Crocus kotschyanus subsp. kotschyanus
  - Crocus kotschyanus subsp. suworowianus (K.Koch) B.Mathew
- Crocus ochroleucus Boiss. & Gaill.
- Crocus scharojanii Ruprecht
  - Crocus scharojanii subsp. scharojanii
  - Crocus scharojanii subsp. lazicus (Boiss.) B.Mathew
- Crocus vallicola Herb.

==== *Series Crocus (Note: Autonym) ====
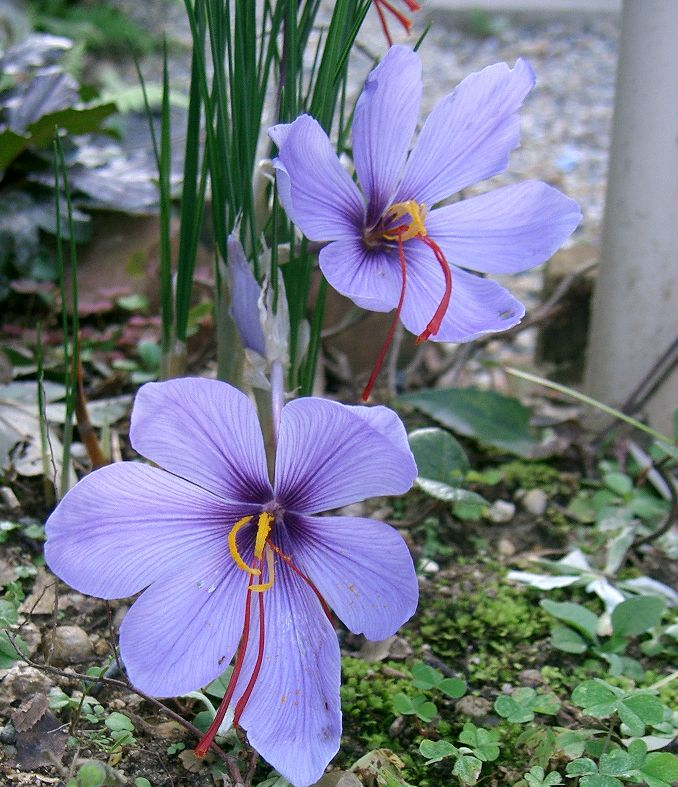
Crocus sativus (Section Crocus, Series Crocus)

- Type species Crocus sativus: autumn-flowering, anthers yellow, style distinctly three-branched

- Crocus asumaniae B. Mathew & T. Baytop
- Crocus cartwrightianus Herb.
  - Crocus sativus L. – saffron crocus (a sterile triploid mutant or hybrid), presumably derived from Crocus cartwrightianus
- Crocus dispathaceus (Bowles) B.Mathew
- Crocus hadriaticus Herb.
  - Crocus hadriaticus subsp. hadriaticus
  - Crocus hadriaticus subsp. parnassicus (B.Mathew) B.Mathew
  - Crocus hadriaticus subsp. parnonicus B.Mathew
- Crocus moabiticus Bornm. & Dinsmore ex Bornm.
- Crocus mathewii H. Kemdorff & E. Pasche (1994)
- Crocus naqabensis Al-Eisawi (2001)
- Crocus oreocreticus B.L. Burtt
- Crocus pallasii Goldb.
  - Crocus pallasii subsp. haussknechtii (Boiss. & Reut. ex Maw) B.Mathew
  - Crocus pallasii subsp. pallasii
  - Crocus pallasii subsp. turcicus B.Mathew
- Crocus thomasii Ten.

==== Position unclear ====
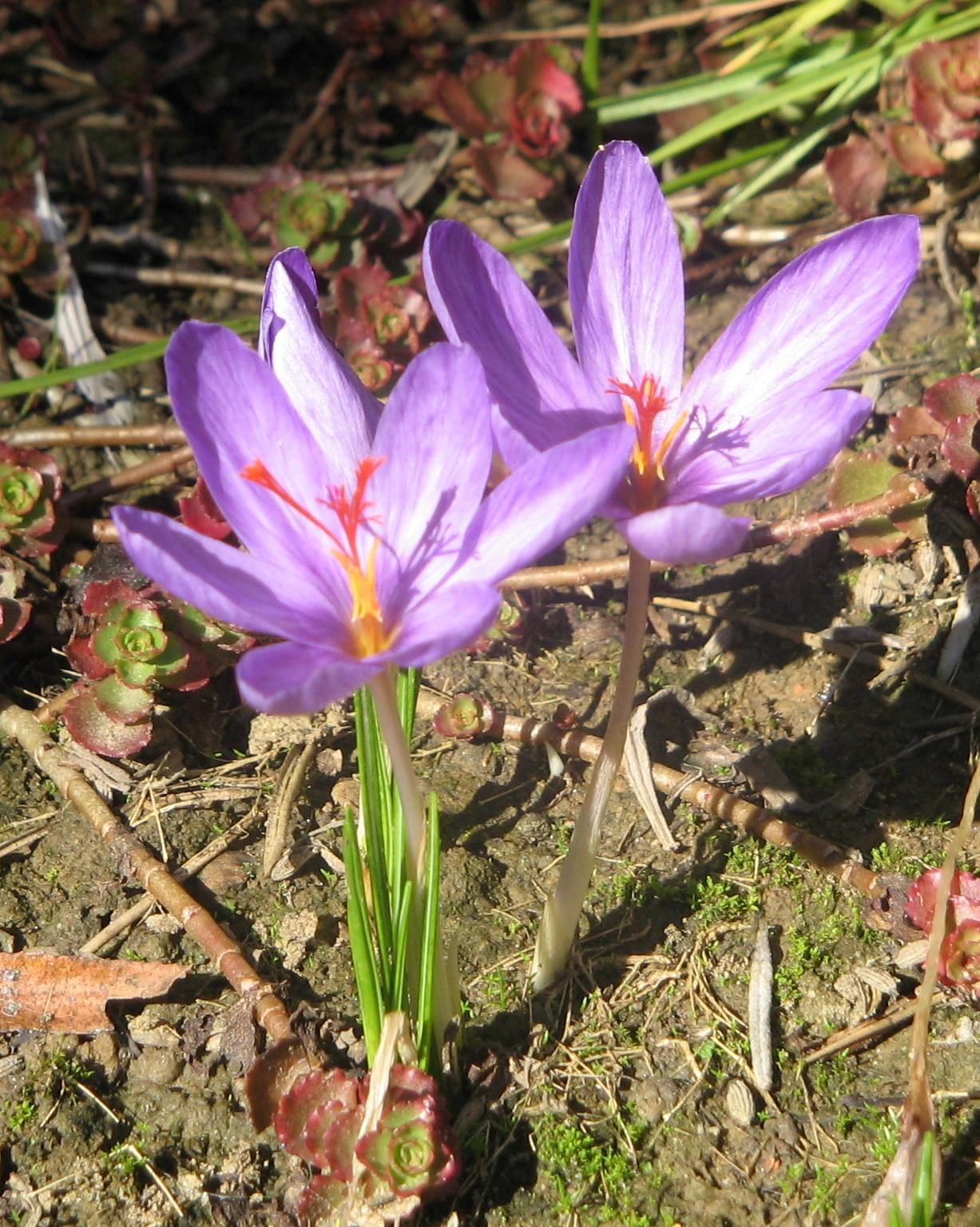
Crocus ligusticus (Section Crocus, Series Longiflori)

- Following 2009 revision of Mathew 1982.

- Crocus malyi Vis. (formerly in Series Versicolores)
- Crocus banaticus Heuff. (formerly in obsolete Subgenus Crociris)

- Former Series Longiflori B.Mathew Type species C. longiflorus Raf.: autumn-flowering, yellow anthers, styles much divided – now unplaced, and type species moved to series Verni

- Crocus goulimyi Turrill (see also Constantine Goulimis)
- Crocus ligusticus M.G. Mariotti (Syn. Crocus medius Balb.)
- Crocus niveus Bowles
- Crocus nudiflorus Smith.
- Crocus serotinus Salisb. – late crocus
  - Crocus serotinus subsp. clusii (J.Gay) B.Mathew
  - Crocus serotinus subsp. salzmannii (J.Gay) B.Mathew
  - Crocus serotinus subsp. serotinus

Crocus sieberi aggregate (Note: Closely related species, which have been proposed as a new series Sieberi)

- Crocus cvijicii Kos.
- Crocus dalmaticus Vis.
- Crocus jablanicensis N. Randj. & V. Randj.
- Crocus novicii V.Randjel. & Miljkovic
- Crocus robertianus C.D. Brickell
- Crocus rujanensis Randjel. & D.A. Hill
- Crocus sieberi J.Gay – Sieber's crocus, Cretan crocus (Note: C. sieberi originally considered to belong to section Nudiscpapus on the basis of lack of a prophyll, clearly segregates with the species in section Crocus (Clade A))
  - Crocus sieberi subsp. atticus (Boiss. & Orph.) B.Mathew
  - Crocus sieberi subsp. nivalis (Bory & Chaub.) B.Mathew
  - Crocus sieberi subsp. sieberi
  - Crocus sieberi subsp. sublimis (Herb.) B.Mathew
- Crocus veluchensis Herb.

=== Section Nudiscapus B.Mathew ===
Species without a basal prophyll. Type species C. reticulatus Stev. ex Adams

- Crocus lydius Kernd. & Pasche (unplaced)

==== *Series Orientales B.Mathew (Clade B) ====
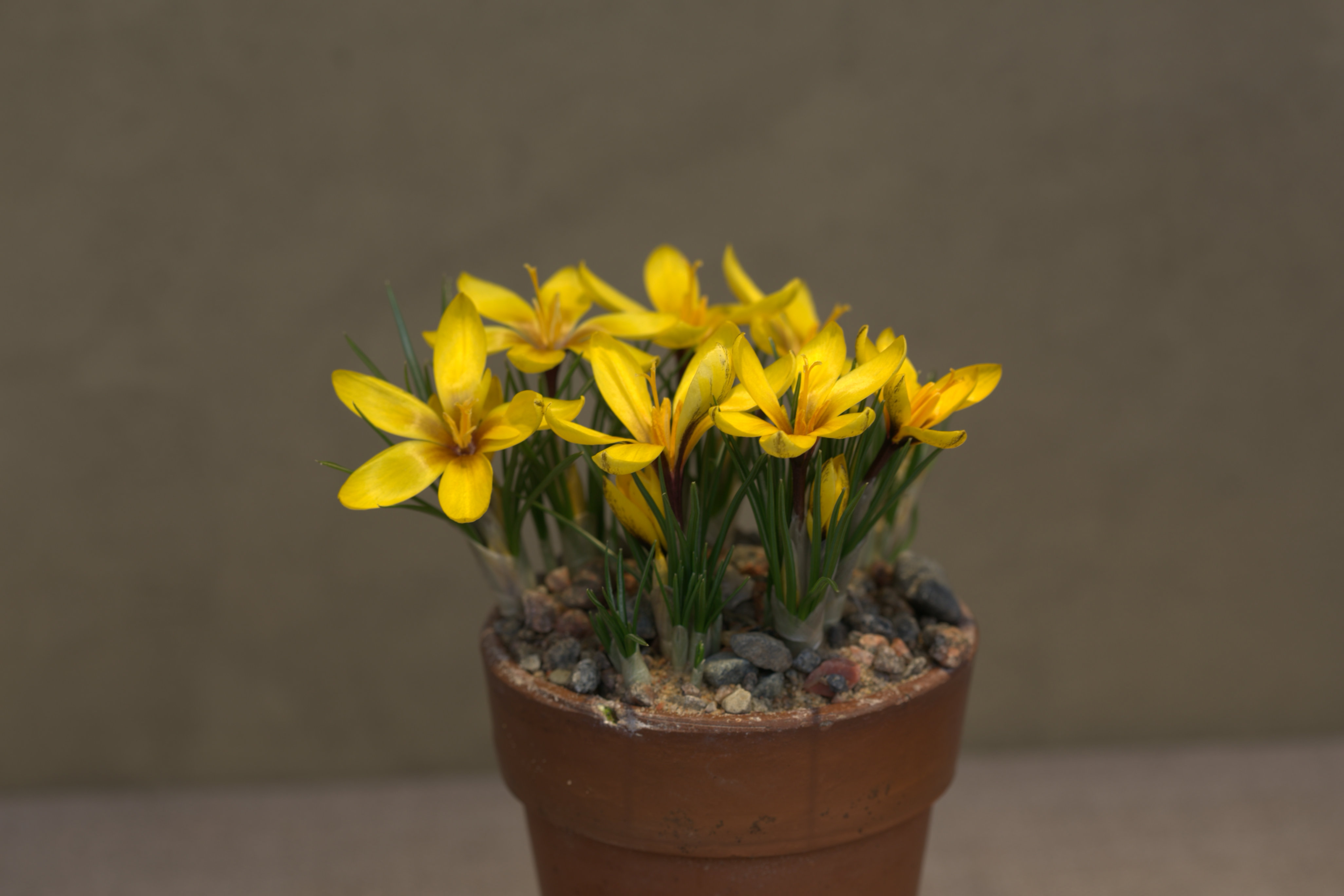
Crocus korolkowii

- Type species Crocus korolkowii: Corm with parallel fibers or lightly reticulated, numerous leaves, spring-flowering, style three-forked

- Crocus alatavicus Semenova & Reg.
- Crocus caspius Fischer & Meyer (formerly in Series Biflori)
- Crocus korolkowii Regel ex Maw – celandine crocus
- Crocus michelsonii B. Fedtsch.

==== *Series Carpetani B.Mathew (Clade C) ====
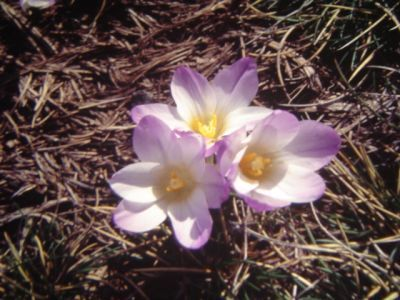
Crocus carpetanus

- Type species Crocus carpetanus: Undersurface of the leaves rounded with grooves, upper surface channeled, spring-flowering, style whitish, obscurely divided

- Crocus carpetanus Boiss. & Reut.
- Crocus nevadensis Amo & Campo

==== *Series Reticulati B.Mathew (Clade D) ====
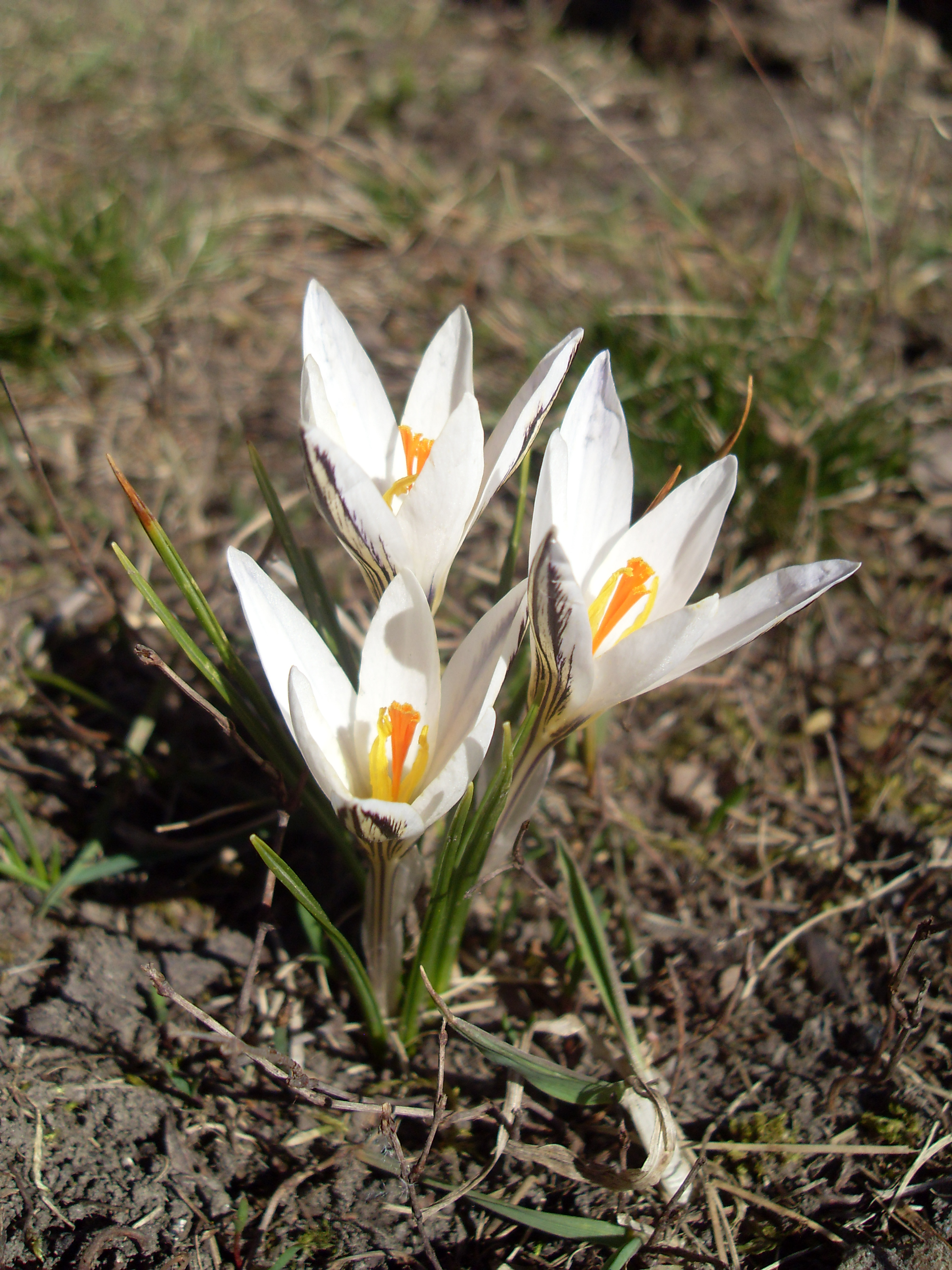
Crocus reticulatus

- Type species Crocus reticulatus: Spring-flowering, a bracteole, trifid styles, and reticulate corm tunics (Series Reticulati s.s. Harpke et al.) (Note: Series Reticulati s.l. were previously characterised as – Corm tunic for the most part decidedly covered with reticulated fibers, flower produced in winter or spring, style three-forked or much divided)

Series Reticulati s.s.

- Crocus ancyrensis (Herb.) Maw syn. Crocus reticulatus var. ancyrensis Herb. – Ankara crocus
- Crocus angustifolius Weston – cloth-of-gold crocus
- Crocus danubensis Kerndorff, Pasche, N.Randjelovic & V.Randjelovic
- Crocus filis-maculatis Kerndorff & Pasche
- Crocus micranthus Boiss.
- Crocus orphei Karamplianis & Constantin.
- Crocus reticulatus Steven ex Weber & Mohr
- Crocus variegatus Hoppe & Hornsch.

Former members of Series Reticulati s.l. (unplaced) (Note: Species belonging to the Crocus sieberi aggregate, are now recognised as belonging in section Crocus)

- Crocus abantensis T.Baytop & B.Mathew
- Crocus cancellatus Herb.
  - Crocus cancellatus subsp. cancellatus
  - Crocus cancellatus subsp. damascenus (Herb.) B.Mathew
  - Crocus cancellatus subsp. lycius B.Mathew
  - Crocus cancellatus subsp. mazziaricus (Herb.) B.Mathew
  - Crocus cancellatus subsp. pamphylicus B.Mathew
- Crocus gargaricus Herb.
- Crocus herbertii B. athew
- Crocus hermoneus Kotschy ex Maw
- Crocus hittiticus T.Baytop & B.Mathew syn. Crocus reticulatus subsp. hittiticus (T.Baytop & B.Mathew) B.Mathew
- Crocus sieheanus Barr ex B.L. Burtt

==== Series Biflori B.Mathew (Clade D) ====
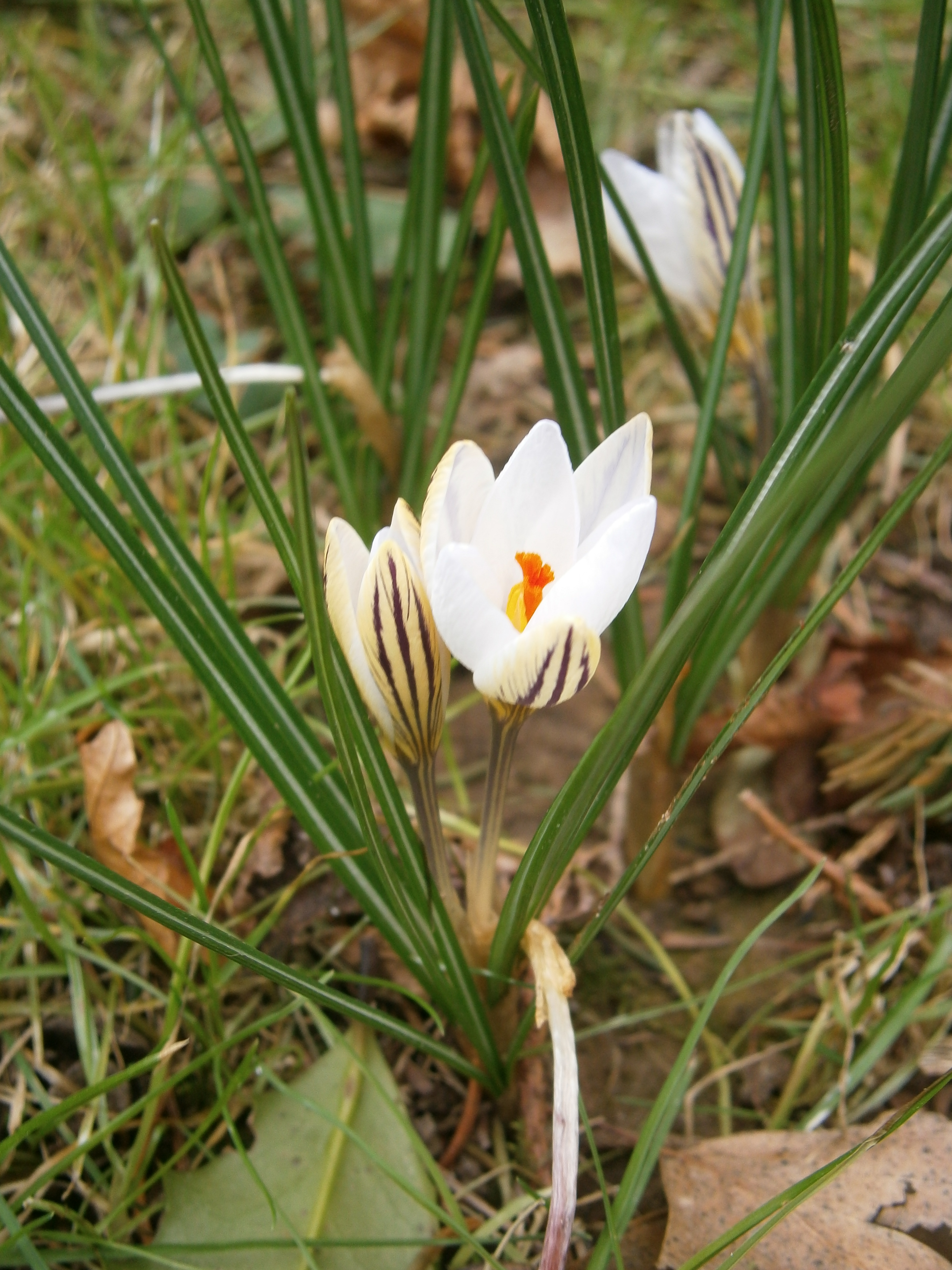
Crocus biflorus

- Type species Crocus biflorus: Tunics of corms split into rings at the base, either entire or with toothlike projections, leathery in texture, spring- or late-winter flowering, style three-forked

- Crocus adamii Gay syn. Crocus biflorus subsp. adamii (J.Gay) Mathew
- Crocus aerius Herb.
- Crocus albocoronatus (Kernd.) Kernd., Pasche & Harpke syn. C. biflorus subsp. albocoronatus Kerndorff
- Crocus alexandri Nicic ex Velen. syn. Crocus biflorus subsp. alexandri (Nicic ex Velen.) B.Mathew
- Crocus almehensis C.D. Brickell & B. Mathew
- Crocus artvinensis (J.Philippow) Gossheim syn. Crocus biflorus subsp. artvinensis (J.Philippow) B.Mathew
- Crocus bifloriformis Kernd. & Pasche syn. Crocus biflorus subsp. biflorus B.Mathew
- Crocus biflorus Mill. – silvery crocus, Scotch crocus (Note: C. biflorus was originally considered to have multiple subspecies by Mathew, but subsequently demonstrated to consist of many separate species)
- Crocus caelestis (Kernd.) Kernd., Pasche & Harpke syn. Crocus biflorus subsp. caelestis Kernd. & Pasche
- Crocus chrysanthus Herb. – Golden crocus, Snow crocus
  - Crocus chrysanthus subsp. chrysanthus
  - Crocus chrysanthus subsp. multifolius Papan. & Zacharof
- Crocus crewei Hooker syn. Crocus biflorus subsp. crewei (Hook.f.) B.Mathew
- Crocus cyprius Boiss. & Kotschy
- Crocus danfordiae Maw
  - Crocus danfordiae subsp. danfordiae
  - Crocus danfordiae subsp. kurdistanicus Maroofi & Assadi
- Crocus fibroannulatus (Kernd.) Kernd., Pasche & Harpke syn. Crocus biflorus subsp. fibroannulatus Kernd. & Pasche
- Crocus hartmannianus Holmboe
- Crocus ionopharynx (Kernd.) Kernd., Pasche & Harpke syn. Crocus biflorus subsp. ionopharynx Kernd. & Pasche
- Crocus kerndorffiorum Pasche (1993)
- Crocus leichtlinii (Dewar) Bowles
- Crocus leucostylosus (Kernd.) Kernd., Pasche & Harpke syn. Crocus biflorus subsp. leucostylosus Kernd. & Pasche
- Crocus melantherus (Kernd.) Kernd., Pasche & Harpke syn. Crocus biflorus subsp. melantherus B.Mathew
- Crocus nerimaniae Yüzbasioglu & Varol (2004)
- Crocus nubigena Herbert syn. Crocus biflorus subsp. nubigena (Herb.) B.Mathew
- Crocus pestalozzae Boiss.
- Crocus pseudonubigena (B.Mathew) Kernd., Pasche & Harpke syn. Crocus biflorus subsp. pseudonubigena B.Mathew
- Crocus pulchricolor Herb. ex Tchichatscheff syn. Crocus biflorus subsp. pulchricolor (Herb. ex Tchich.) B.Mathew
- Crocus punctatus (Kernd.) Kernd., Pasche & Harpke syn. Crocus biflorus subsp. punctatus B.Mathew
- Crocus stridii Papanicolau & Zacharof syn. Crocus biflorus subsp. stridii (Papan. & Zacharof) B.Mathew
- Crocus tauri Maw syn. Crocus biflorus subsp. tauri (Maw) B.Mathew
- Crocus wattiorum (B.Mathew) B.Mathew syn. Crocus biflorus subsp. wattiorum B.Mathew
- Crocus weldenii Hoppe & Fuernrohr syn. Crocus biflorus subsp. weldenii (Hoppe & Fuernr.) B.Mathew
- Crocus demirizianus O.Erol & L.Can (2012)
- Crocus yakarianus Yıldırım & O.Erol (2013)
- Crocus yataganensis (Kernd.) Kernd., Pasche & Harpke syn. Crocus biflorus subsp. yataganensis Kernd. & Pasche

*Series Lyciotauri Kerndorff & Pasche (Clade D)(new)

- Type species Crocus lyciotauricus: Outer corm tunics coriaceous or co-riaceous to membranous

- Crocus atrospermus (Kernd. & Pasche) Kernd. & Pasche syn. Crocus biflorus subsp. atrospermus Kernd. & Pasche
- Crocus akdagensis Kerndorff & Pasche
- Crocus akkayaensis Kerndorff & Pasche
- Crocus beydaglarensis Kerndorff & Pasche
- Crocus bowlesianus Kerndorff & Pasche
- Crocus calanthus Kerndorff & Pasche
- Crocus katrancensis Kerndorff & Pasche
- Crocus lyciotauricus Kerndorff & Pasche
- Crocus oreogenus Kerndorff & Pasche
- Crocus salurdagensis Kerndorff & Pasche
- Crocus xanthosus Kerndorff & Pasche
- Crocus ziyaretensis Kerndorff & Pasche

==== *Series Isauri Kerndorff & Pasche (Clade D) ====
- Type species Crocus isauricus: Outer corm tunics annulate and coriaceous (Note: Crocus isauricus and relatives, formerly series Biflori)

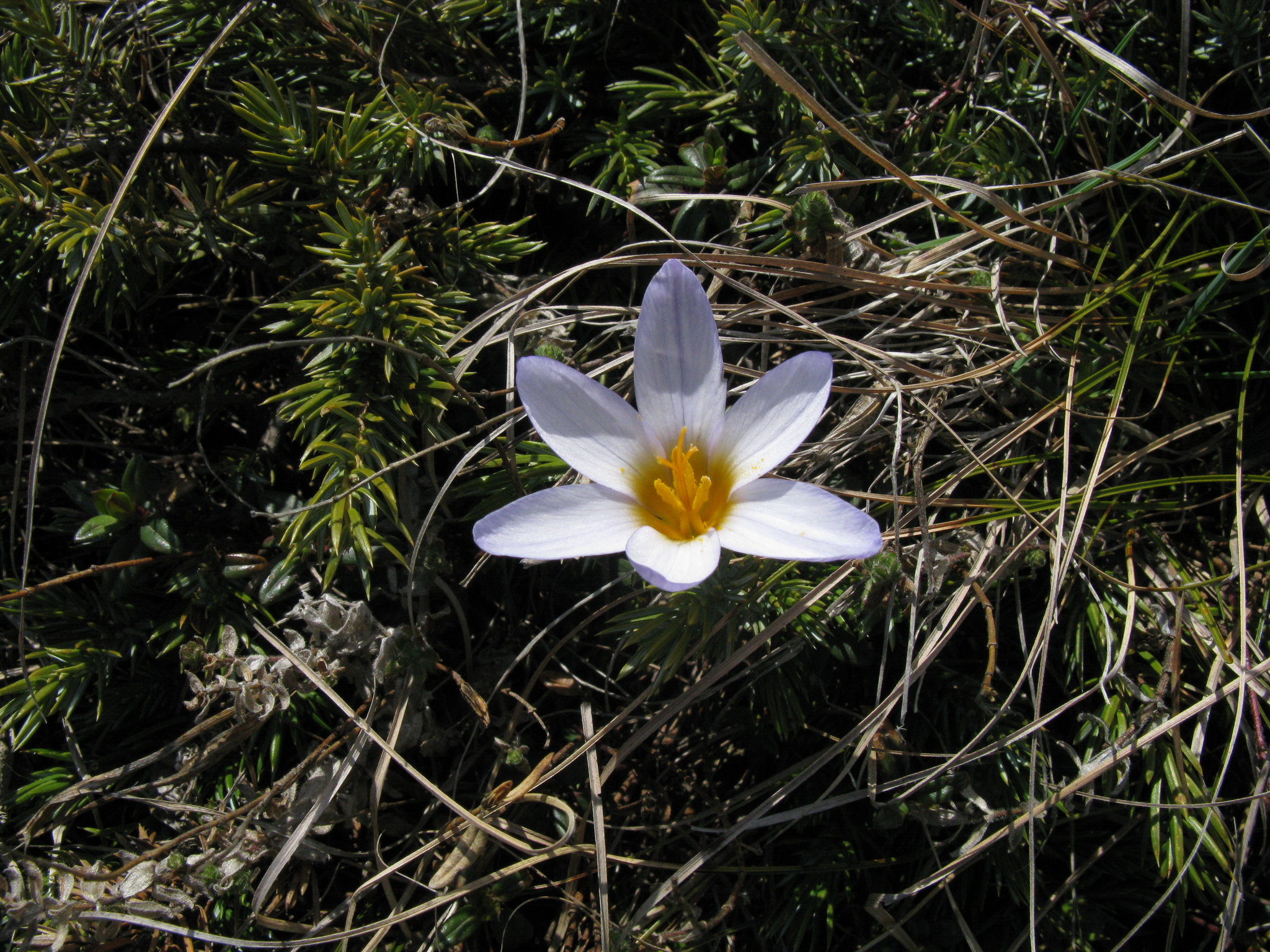
Crocus tauricus

- Crocus abracteolus
- Crocus antherotes
- Crocus caricus (Kernd.) Kernd., Pasche & Harpke syn. Crocus biflorus subsp. caricus Kernd. & Pasche
- Crocus concinnus Kerndorff & Pasche
- Crocus fauseri
- Crocus isauricus Kerndorff & Pasche (ex Bowles) syn. Crocus biflorus subsp. isauricus (Siehe ex Bowles) B.Mathew
- Crocus karamanensis
- Crocus mawii
- Crocus mersinensis
- Crocus rechingeri Kerndorff & Pasche
- Crocus taseliensis
- Crocus tauricus

==== *Series Speciosi B.Mathew (Clade D) ====
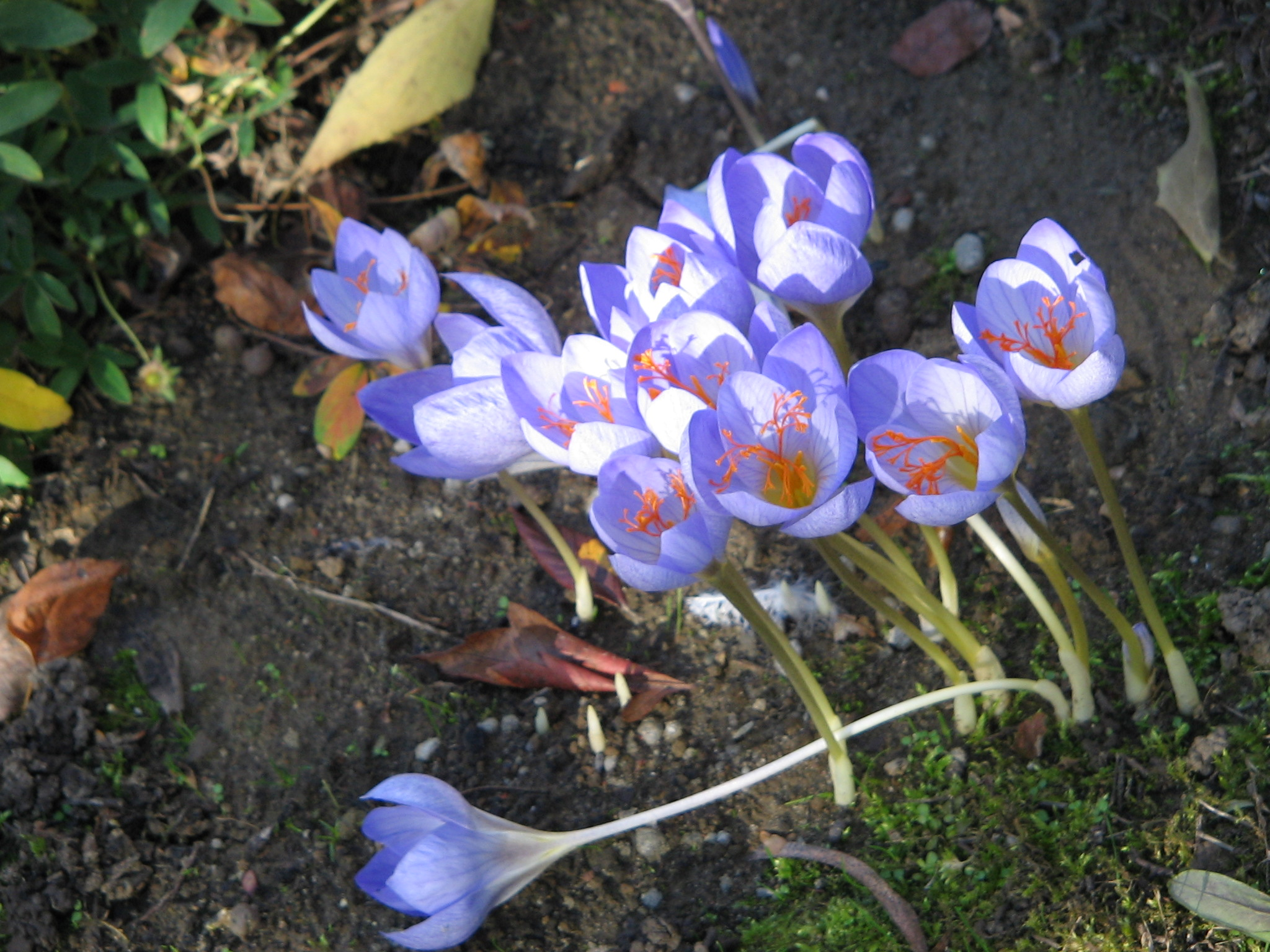
Crocus speciosus

- Type species Crocus speciosus: Corm tunic splits into rings at the base, leathery or membranous, foliage after the flowers, autumn-flowering, style much divided

- Crocus pulchellus Herb. – hairy crocus
- Crocus speciosus M. Bieb. – Bieberstein's crocus, large purple crocus
  - Crocus speciosus subsp. ilgazensis B.Mathew
  - Crocus speciosus subsp. speciosus
  - Crocus speciosus subsp. xantholaimos B.Mathew

==== Series Flavi B.Mathew (Clade D) ====
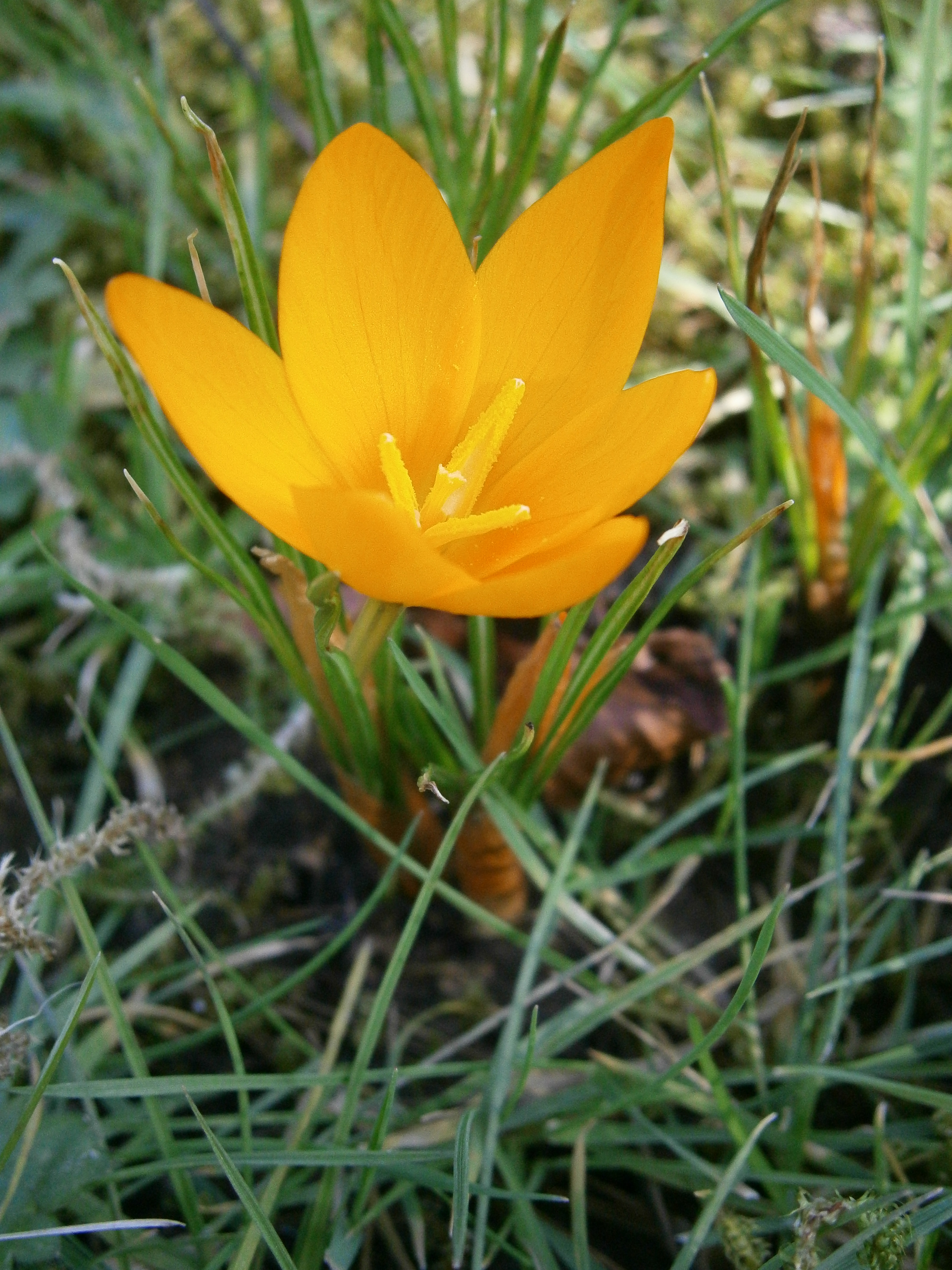
Crocus flavus

- Type species Crocus flavus: Tunics of the corms membranous, split into parallel fibers, spring-flowering, styles much divided

- Crocus adanensis T. Baytop & B. Mathew (formerly in Series Biflori)
- Crocus antalyensis Mathew
  - Crocus antalyensis subsp. antalyensis
  - Crocus antalyensis subsp. striatus O.Erol & M.Koçyiğit (2010)
  - Crocus antalyensis subsp. gemicii L.Sik & O.Erol (2011)
- Crocus candidus E.D. Clarke
- Crocus flavus Weston – Yellow crocus
  - Crocus flavus subsp. flavus
  - Crocus flavus subsp. dissectus T.Baytop & B.Mathew
  - Crocus flavus subsp. sarichinarensis Rukšans
- Crocus graveolens Boiss. &Reut.
- Crocus hyemalis Boiss.
- Crocus olivieri Gray
  - Crocus olivieri subsp. olivieri – Balkan and Turkey
  - Crocus olivieri subsp. balansae (J.Gay ex Baker) B. Mathew – endemic round İzmir, West-Turkey
  - Crocus olivieri subsp. istanbulensis B. Mathew, Istanbul, Turkey.
- Crocus paschei H. Kerndorff
- Crocus vitellinus Wahl.

==== *Series Aleppici B.Mathew (Clade D) ====
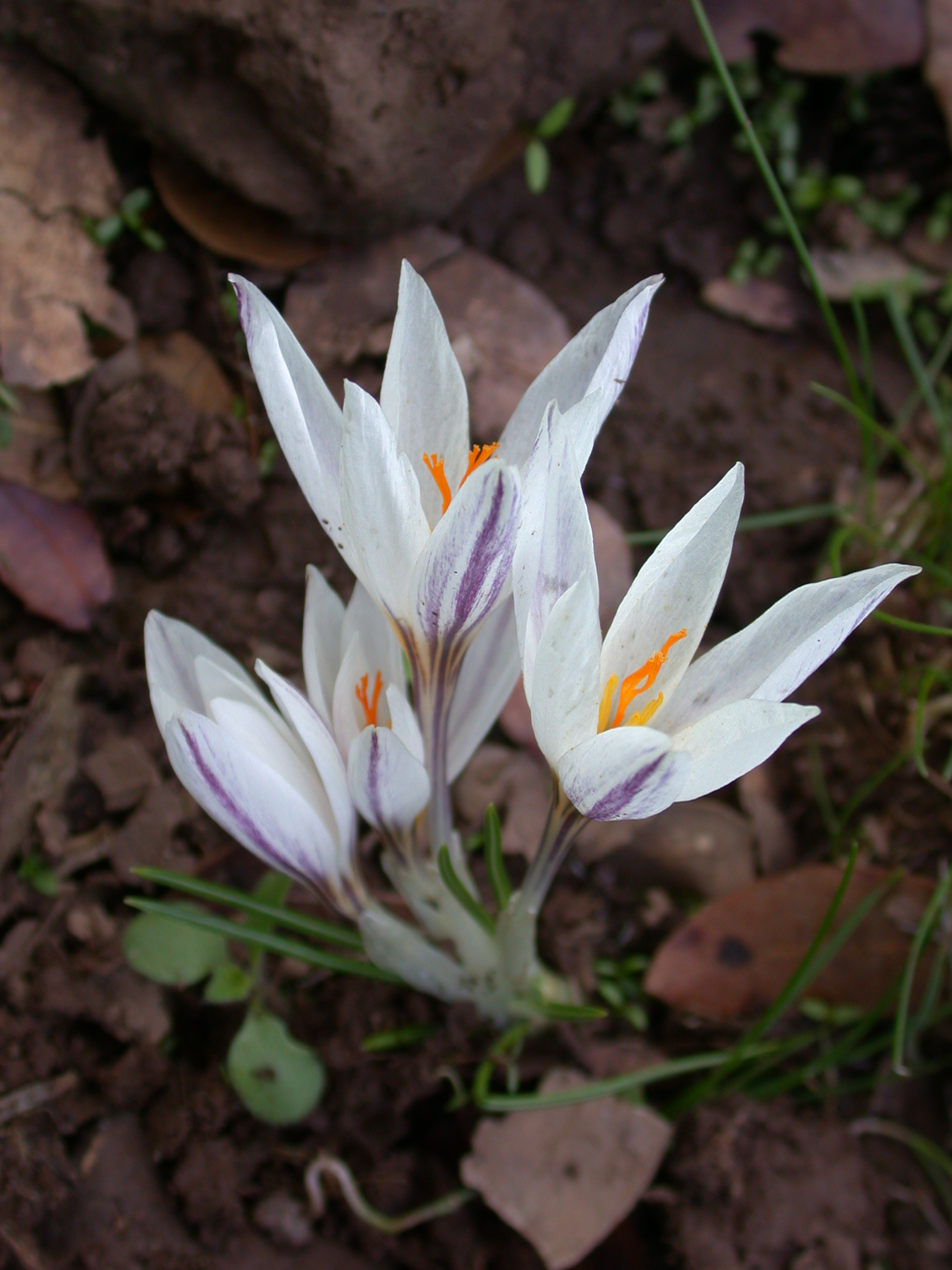
Crocus aleppicus

- Type species Crocus aleppicus: Tunics of the corms membranous, with split, parallel fibers, foliage produced at the same time as the flowers, fall- or winter-flowering

- Crocus aleppicus Baker
- Crocus baalbekensis K. Addam & M. Bou Hamdan
- Crocus boulosii Greuter
- Crocus veneris Tappein ex Poech

==== Series Intertexti B.Mathew (Clade D) ====
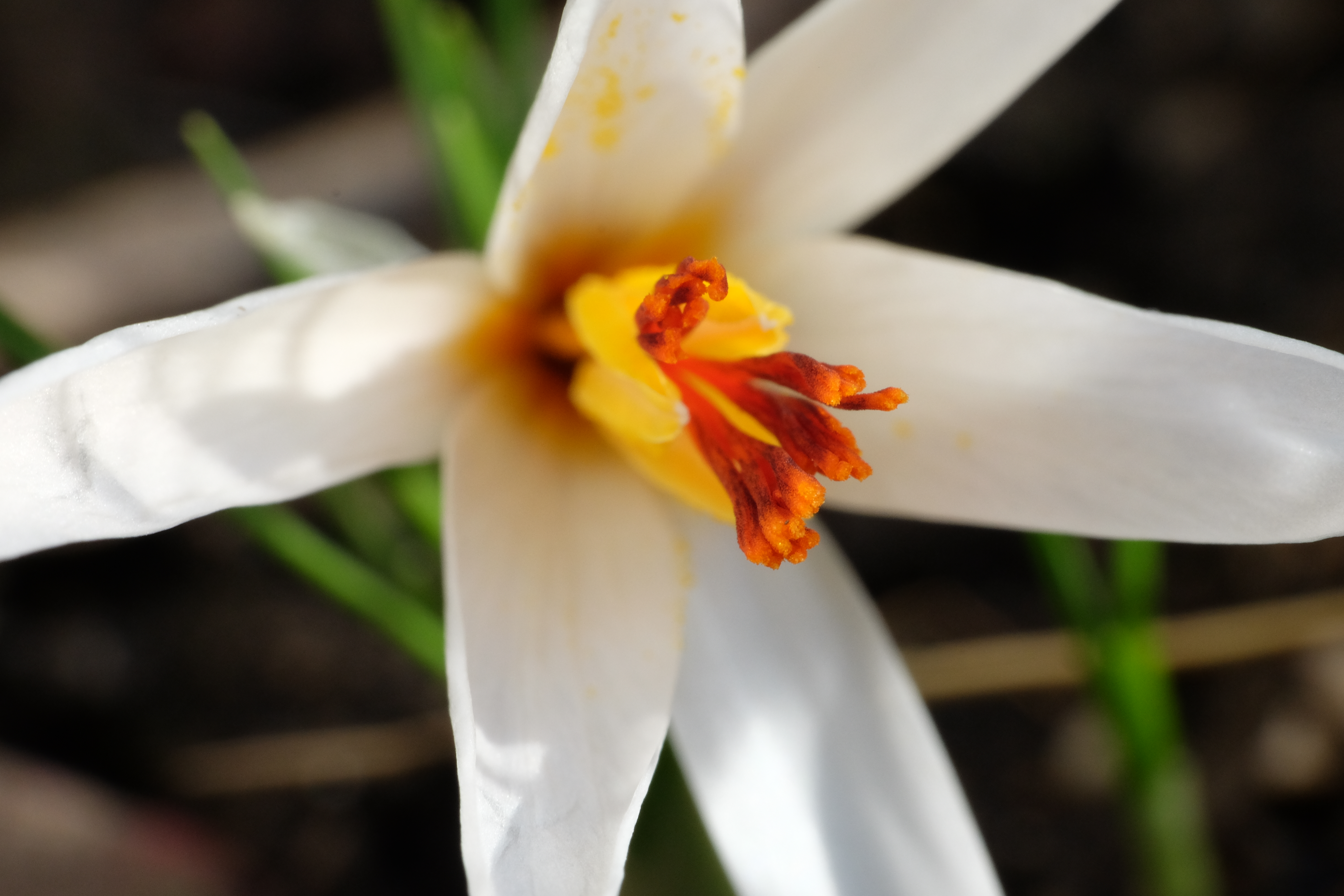
Crocus fleischeri

- Type species Crocus fleischeri: Corm tunic fibrous with fibers interwoven, spring-flowering

- Crocus fleischeri J.Gay.

==== *Series Laevigatae B.Mathew (Clade D) ====
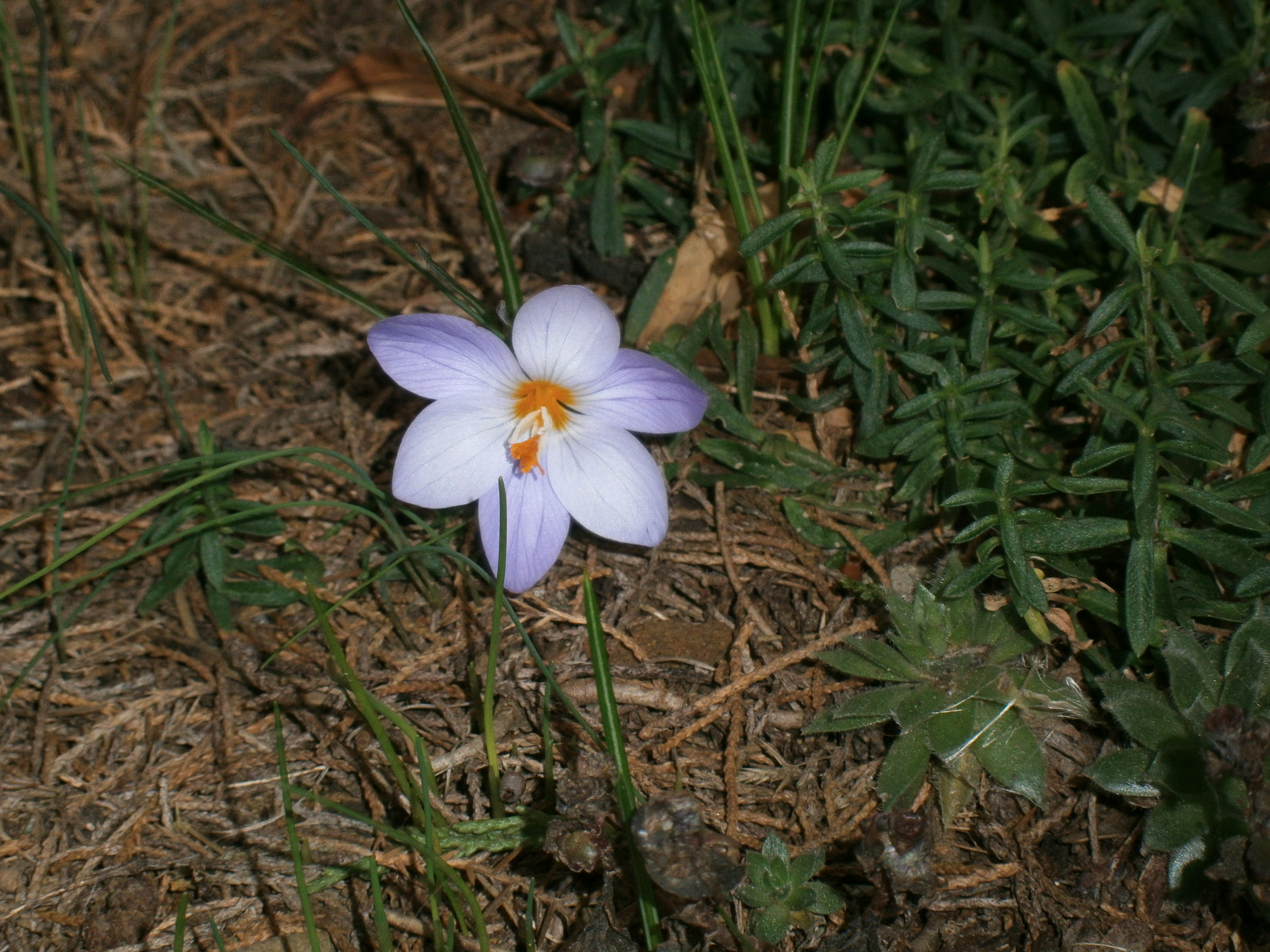
Crocus laevigatus

- Type species Crocus laevigatus Corm tunic membranous or splitting into parallel fibers, sometimes leathery, foliage produced at the same time as flowers, autumn-flowering, anthers white, style much divided

- Crocus boryi J.Gay
- Crocus laevigatus Bory & Chaub.
- Crocus tournefortii J.Gay.

== Bibliography ==
- Linnaeus, Carl (1753). "Crocus". Species Plantarum: exhibentes plantas rite cognitas, ad genera relatas, cum differentiis specificis, nominibus trivialibus, synonymis selectis, locis natalibus, secundum systema sexuale digestas. Vol. 1. Stockholm: Impensis Laurentii Salvii. p. 36., see also Species Plantarum
- Harpke, Dörte; Meng, Shuchun; Rutten, Twan; Kerndorff, Helmut; Blattner, Frank R. (March 2013). "Phylogeny of Crocus (Iridaceae) based on one chloroplast and two nuclear loci: Ancient hybridization and chromosome number evolution". Molecular Phylogenetics and Evolution. 66 (3): 617–627. doi:10.1016/j.ympev.2012.10.007. PMID 23123733.
- Harpke, Dörte; Peruzzi, Lorenzo; Kerndorff, Helmut; Karamplianis, Theophanis; Constantinidis, Theophanis; Ranđelović, Vladimir; Ranđelović, Novica; Jušković, Marina; Pasche, Erich; Blattner, Frank R. (2014). "Phylogeny, geographic distribution, and new taxonomic circumscription of the Crocus reticulatus species group (Iridaceae)". Turkish Journal of Botany. 38: 1182–1198. doi:10.3906/bot-1405-60.
- Harpke, Dörte; Carta, Angelino; Tomović, Gordana; Ranđelović, Vladimir; Ranđelović, Novica; Blattner, Frank R.; Peruzzi, Lorenzo (January 2015). "Phylogeny, karyotype evolution and taxonomy of Crocus series Verni (Iridaceae)". Plant Systematics and Evolution. 301 (1): 309–325. doi:10.1007/s00606-014-1074-0. S2CID 18507508.
- Harpke, Dörte; Kerndorff, Helmut; Pasche, Erich; Peruzzi, Lorenzi (11 May 2016). "Neotypification of the name Crocus biflorus Mill. (Iridaceae) and its consequences in the taxonomy of the genus". Phytotaxa. 260 (2): 131–143. doi:10.11646/phytotaxa.260.2.3.
- Harpke, Dörte; Kerndorff, Helmut; Raca, Irena; Pasche, Erich (23 September 2017). "A New Serbian Endemic Species Of The Genus Crocus (Iridaceae)". Biologica Nyssana. 8 (1): 7–13. doi:10.5281/zenodo.962907.
- Kerndorff, H; Pasche, E; Harpke, D; Blattner, FR (2012). "Seven New Species of Crocus (Liliiflorae, Iridaceae) from Turkey" (PDF). Stapfia. 97: 3–16.
- Kerndorff, H; Pasche, E; Blattner, FR; Harpke, D (2013). "Fourteen New Species of Crocus (Liliiflorae, Iridaceae) from West, South-West and South-Central Turkey" (PDF). Stapfia. 99: 145–158.
- Kerndorff, Helmut; Pasche, Erich; Harpke, Dörte (2014). "Crocus isauricus Siehe ex BowleS (Liliiflorae, Iridaceae) and its relatives" (PDF). Stapfia. 101: 3–18.
- Kerndorff, Helmut; Pasche, Erich; Harpke, Dörte (2015). "Crocus lyciotauricus Kerndorff & Pasche (Liliiflorae, Iridaceae) and its relatives" (PDF). Stapfia. 103: 67–80.
- Mathew, Brian; Petersen, Gitte; Seberg, Ole (2009). "A reassessment of Crocus based on molecular analysis". The Plantsman. New Series. 8 (1): 50–57.
- Miljković, Milica; Ranđelović, Vladimir; Harpke, Dörte (9 June 2016). "A new species of Crocus (Iridaceae) from southern Albania (SW Balkan Peninsula)". Phytotaxa. 265 (1): 39–49. doi:10.11646/phytotaxa.265.1.3.
- Papanicolaou, K.; Zacharof, E. (17 January 1980). "Crocus in greece new taxa and chromosome numbers". Botaniska Notiser. 133 (2): 155–164.
- Peruzzi, Lorenzo; Carta, Angelino (February 2011). "Crocus ilvensis sp. nov. (sect. Crocus, Iridaceae), endemic to Elba Island (Tuscan Archipelago, Italy)". Nordic Journal of Botany. 29 (1): 6–13. doi:10.1111/j.1756-1051.2010.01023.x.
- Raca, Irena; Harpke, Dörte; Shuka, Lulëzim; Ranđelović, Vladimir (19 October 2020). "A new species of Crocus ser. Verni (Iridaceae) with 2 n = 12 chromosomes from the Balkans". Plant Biosystems. 156: 36–42. doi:10.1080/11263504.2020.1829735. S2CID 225006706.
- "Crocus". World Checklist of Selected Plant Families. Royal Botanic Gardens, Kew.
