= Crocus alexandri =

Scientific classification
- Kingdom: Plantae
- Clade: Tracheophytes
- Clade: Angiosperms
- Clade: Monocots
- Order: Asparagales
- Family: Iridaceae
- Genus: Crocus
- Species: C. alexandri

Binomial name
- Crocus alexandri Nicic ex Velen.

Synonyms
- Crocus alexandri f. albiflorus Randjel.; Crocus alexandri f. violaceolineatus Randjel.; Crocus biflorus f. alexandri (Nicic ex Velen.) Stjepanovic-Veselicic; Crocus biflorus subsp. alexandri (Nicic ex Velen.) B.Mathew

Species of flowering plant

Crocus alexandri is a species of flowering plant in the genus Crocus of the family Iridaceae. It is a cormous perennial native from Serbia to southwest Bulgaria and Greece.
