= Crocus rujanensis =

Scientific classification
- Kingdom: Plantae
- Clade: Tracheophytes
- Clade: Angiosperms
- Clade: Monocots
- Order: Asparagales
- Family: Iridaceae
- Genus: Crocus
- Species: C. rujanensis

Binomial name
- Crocus rujanensis Randjel. & D.A.Hill

Species of flowering plant

Crocus rujanensis is a species of flowering plant in the genus Crocus of the family Iridaceae. It is a cormous perennial native from southern Serbia to northern Macedonia.
