= Crocus yakarianus =

Scientific classification
- Kingdom: Plantae
- Clade: Embryophytes
- Clade: Tracheophytes
- Clade: Angiosperms
- Clade: Monocots
- Order: Asparagales
- Family: Iridaceae
- Genus: Crocus
- Species: C. yakarianus

Binomial name
- Crocus yakarianus Yildirim & Erol

Species of flowering plant

Crocus yakarianus is a species of flowering plant in the genus Crocus of the family Iridaceae. It is a cormous perennial native to Turkey (Malatya Province).
