= Crocus antalyensis =

Scientific classification
- Kingdom: Plantae
- Clade: Tracheophytes
- Clade: Angiosperms
- Clade: Monocots
- Order: Asparagales
- Family: Iridaceae
- Genus: Crocus
- Species: C. antalyensis

Binomial name
- Crocus antalyensis B.Mathew

Species of flowering plant

Crocus antalyensis is a species of flowering plant in the genus Crocus of the family Iridaceae. It is a cormous perennial native to Turkey.

The species grows evergreen oak scrub around 1000 meters in altitude: flowering occurs in early spring.

There are three subspecies:

- Crocus antalyensis subsp. antalyensis
- Crocus antalyensis subsp. gemicii Sik & Erol
- Crocus antalyensis subsp. striatus Erol & Kocyigit
