= Crocus ilvensis =

Scientific classification
- Kingdom: Plantae
- Clade: Tracheophytes
- Clade: Angiosperms
- Clade: Monocots
- Order: Asparagales
- Family: Iridaceae
- Genus: Crocus
- Species: C. ilvensis

Binomial name
- Crocus ilvensis Peruzzi & Carta

Species of flowering plant

Crocus ilvensis is a species of flowering plant in the genus Crocus of the family Iridaceae. It is a cormous perennial endemic to Elba Island (Tuscan Archipelago, Italy).
