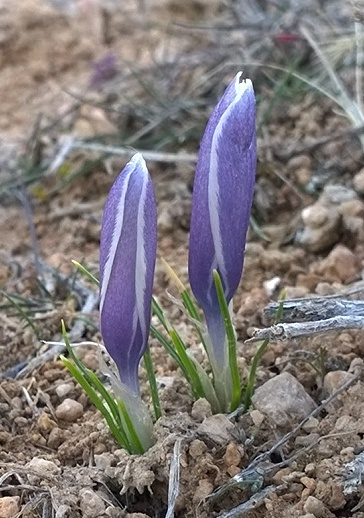

Scientific classification
- Kingdom: Plantae
- Clade: Tracheophytes
- Clade: Angiosperms
- Clade: Monocots
- Order: Asparagales
- Family: Iridaceae
- Genus: Crocus
- Species: C. michelsonii

Binomial name
- Crocus michelsonii B.Fedtsch.

= Crocus michelsonii =

Species of flowering plant

Crocus michelsonii is a species of flowering plant in the genus Crocus of the family Iridaceae. It is a cormous perennial with a native range from northeastern Iran to southern Turkmenistan.
