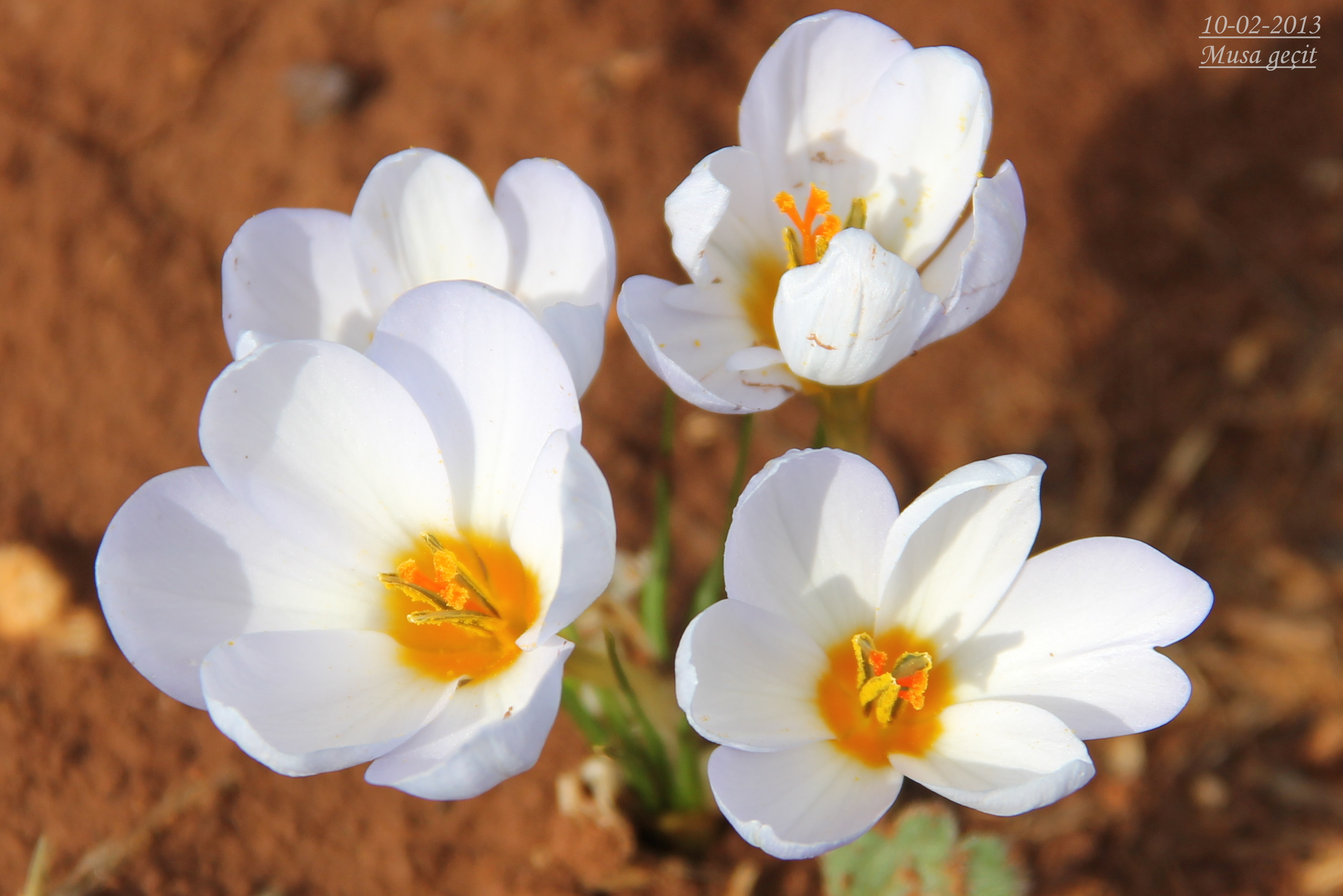
- Crocus leichtlinii

Scientific classification
- Kingdom: Plantae
- Clade: Tracheophytes
- Clade: Angiosperms
- Clade: Monocots
- Order: Asparagales
- Family: Iridaceae
- Genus: Crocus
- Species: C. leichtlinii

Binomial name
- Crocus leichtlinii (Dewer) Bowles

= Crocus leichtlinii =

Species of flowering plant

Crocus leichtlinii is a species of flowering plant in the genus Crocus of the family Iridaceae. It is a cormous perennial native to south eastern Turkey.
