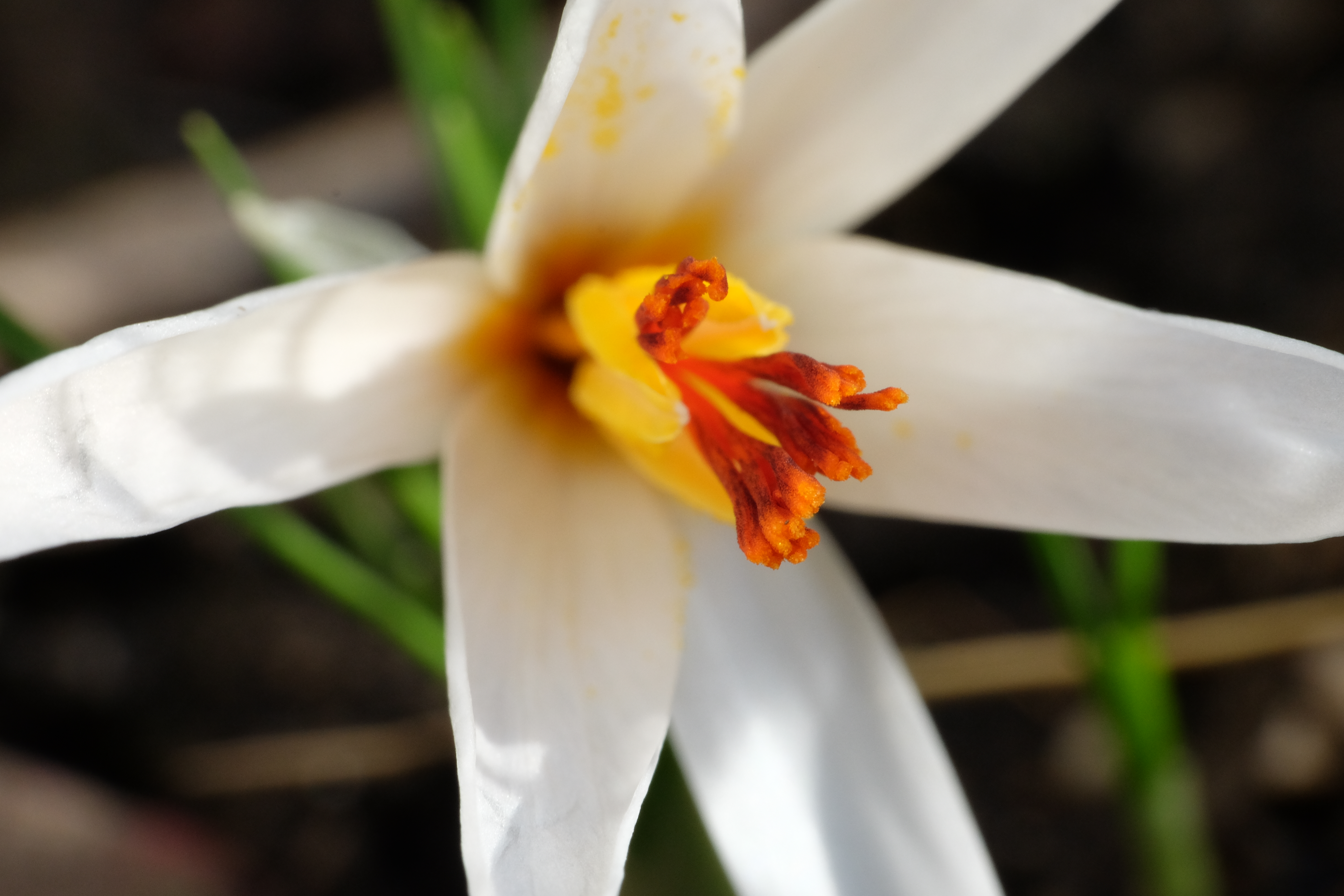
- Flower closeup

Scientific classification
- Kingdom: Plantae
- Clade: Tracheophytes
- Clade: Angiosperms
- Clade: Monocots
- Order: Asparagales
- Family: Iridaceae
- Genus: Crocus
- Species: C. fleischeri

Binomial name
- Crocus fleischeri J.Gay

Synonyms
- Crocus candidus Boiss.; Crocus fleischerianus Herb.; Crocus parviflorus Baker; Crocus sennii Caval.; Crocus smyrnensis Poech

= Crocus fleischeri =

Species of flowering plant

Crocus fleischeri is a species of flowering plant in the genus Crocus of the family Iridaceae. It is a cormous perennial with a native range from the eastern Aegean Islands to western and south western Turkey.

== Description ==
Crocus fleischeri is a herbaceous perennial geophyte growing from a corm. The corms are small and tear-drop shaped with silky reticulate tunics. The corm inside is yellow and produces leaves at the same time flowering occurs. The white flowers are slender but open widely. The branched stigmas are dark orange-red when the flowers first open and age to cinnamon brown, they are taller than the anthers. The throats of the flowers are variable in color, ranging from yellow, orange, to brown and even blackish. Flowering can occur as early as January if the weather conditions are mild and the plants are winter hardy to USDA zone 6.

It is found growing in evergreen oak scrub and on dry hillside around 1000 meters in altitude; flowering from January till March.
