= Crocus pelistericus =

Scientific classification
- Kingdom: Plantae
- Clade: Tracheophytes
- Clade: Angiosperms
- Clade: Monocots
- Order: Asparagales
- Family: Iridaceae
- Genus: Crocus
- Species: C. pelistericus

Binomial name
- Crocus pelistericus Pulevic

Species of flowering plant

Crocus pelistericus is a species of flowering plant in the genus Crocus of the family Iridaceae. It is a cormous perennial native from eastern Albania to northern Greece.
