= Crocus adanensis =

Scientific classification
- Kingdom: Plantae
- Clade: Embryophytes
- Clade: Tracheophytes
- Clade: Angiosperms
- Clade: Monocots
- Order: Asparagales
- Family: Iridaceae
- Genus: Crocus
- Species: C. adanensis

Binomial name
- Crocus adanensis T.Baytop & B.Mathew

Species of flowering plant

Crocus adanensis is a species of flowering plant in the genus Crocus of the family Iridaceae. It is a cormous perennial native to southern Turkey.
