= Crocus jablanicensis =

Scientific classification
- Kingdom: Plantae
- Clade: Tracheophytes
- Clade: Angiosperms
- Clade: Monocots
- Order: Asparagales
- Family: Iridaceae
- Genus: Crocus
- Species: C. jablanicensis

Binomial name
- Crocus jablanicensis Randjel. & V.Randjel.

Species of flowering plant

Crocus jablanicensis is a species of flowering plant in the genus Crocus of the family Iridaceae. It is a cormous perennial native from eastern Albania to western north Macedonia.

== Description ==
Crocus jablanicensis is a herbaceous perennial geophyte growing from a flattened-subglobose corm that maybe 0.7 to 1 cm in diameter. The corms have papery tunics with thin fibers. Plants have 2 or 3 leaves but occasionally 4, and they are produced at the same time the flowers are. During flowering the 1 to 2.2 mm wide leaves are shorter than the flowers. The unscented, white, flowers are typically solitary or rarely produced two per corm. The flowers have white throats and the perianth tube is 3 to 5 cm long. The white flower filaments are 0.7 to 0.9 cm long. The yellow anthers are 0.6 to 0.8 cm long. The white style is much longer than the anthers, with 3 branches with frilled ends. The 1 to 1.7 cm long fruits are an ellipsoid capsule. The roundish, reddish-brown to dark brown seeds have a distinct raphe.
