= Crocus bertiscensis =

Scientific classification
- Kingdom: Plantae
- Clade: Tracheophytes
- Clade: Angiosperms
- Clade: Monocots
- Order: Asparagales
- Family: Iridaceae
- Genus: Crocus
- Species: C. bertiscensis

Binomial name
- Crocus bertiscensis Raca, Harpke, Shuka & V.Randjel.

Species of flowering plant

Crocus bertiscensis is a species of flowering plant growing from a corm, native to the northern Albanian Alps.
