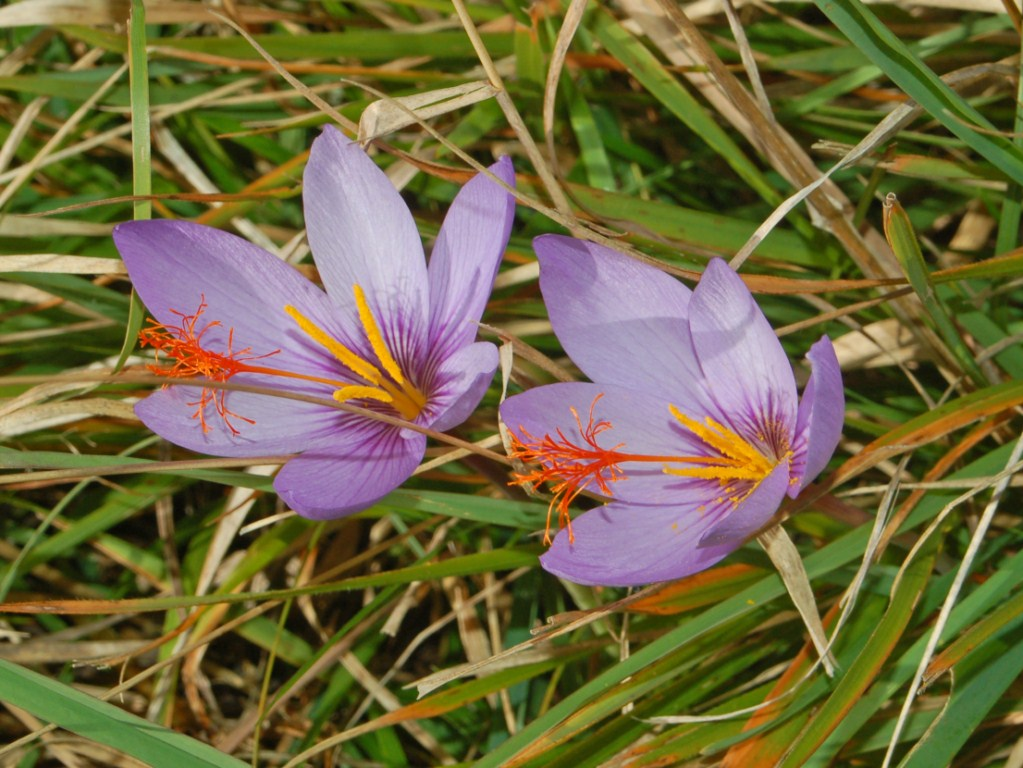
- Crocus ligusticus

Scientific classification
- Kingdom: Plantae
- Clade: Tracheophytes
- Clade: Angiosperms
- Clade: Monocots
- Order: Asparagales
- Family: Iridaceae
- Genus: Crocus
- Species: C. ligusticus

Binomial name
- Crocus ligusticus Mariotti

Synonyms
- Crocus nudiflorus subsp. medius Douin

= Crocus ligusticus =

Species of flowering plant

Crocus ligusticus is a herbaceous perennial plant belonging to the genus Crocus of the family Iridaceae. The genus name Crocus is a Chaldean name meaning "saffron", while the specific Latin name ligusticus, meaning ligurian, refers to the distribution area of this species.

== Description ==
This plant has a corm with 15–25 millimetres (0.59–0.98 in) of diameter. The grass-like ensiform leaves are fully grown in May. They are usually two or three and may reach a maximum height of about 30 centimetres (12 in). The solitary pale purple flowers bear three anthers with yellow-orange pollen and bright red and very fringed stigmas protruding from the large perigonium, making it very characteristic. Crocus ligusticus is an autumn-flowering plant. The flowering period extends from September through October. Like other species of the genus Crocus, it is slightly toxic, due to the alkaloid content.

== Distribution and habitat ==
Crocus ligusticus is a native species of Liguria and the southern Maritime Alps in France and Italy.

These plants can be encountered on woods and meadows in mountain environments, at an altitude of 600–1,700 metres (2,000–5,600 ft) above sea level.

== Cultivation ==
It has gained the Royal Horticultural Society's Award of Garden Merit.
