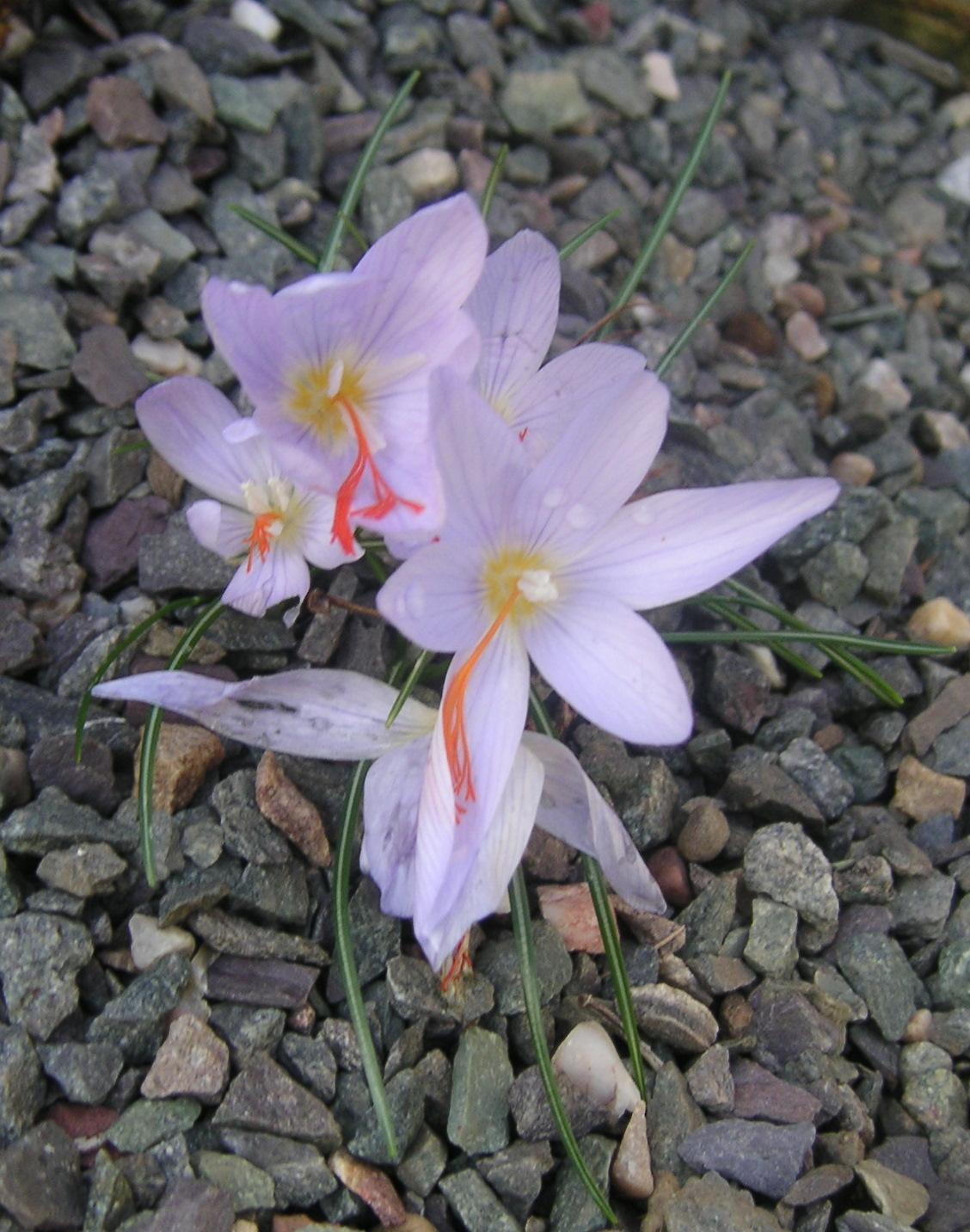

Scientific classification
- Kingdom: Plantae
- Clade: Tracheophytes
- Clade: Angiosperms
- Clade: Monocots
- Order: Asparagales
- Family: Iridaceae
- Genus: Crocus
- Species: C. tournefortii

Binomial name
- Crocus tournefortii J.Gay

Synonyms
- Crocus boryi subsp. tournefortii (J.Gay) Greuter, Matthäs & Risse; Crocus tournefortianus Herb.; Crocus fontenayi Nyman; Crocus orphanidis Hook.f.; Crocus parvulus Herb. ex Maw; Crocus pholegandrius Orph.

= Crocus tournefortii =

Species of flowering plant

Crocus tournefortii, the Tournefort crocus, is a species of flowering plant in the iris family Iridaceae. It is from South Greece and Northern Crete.

Growing to 10 cm (3.9 in), it is a cormous perennial with narrow sword-shaped leaves and pale lilac flowers appearing in autumn and winter. It has gained the Royal Horticultural Society's Award of Garden Merit.
