= Crocus dispathaceus =

Scientific classification
- Kingdom: Plantae
- Clade: Tracheophytes
- Clade: Angiosperms
- Clade: Monocots
- Order: Asparagales
- Family: Iridaceae
- Genus: Crocus
- Species: C. dispathaceus

Binomial name
- Crocus dispathaceus (Boiss. & Reut. ex Maw) Boiss.

Synonyms
- Crocus pallasii subsp. dispathaceus (Bowles) B.Mathew

Species of flowering plant

Crocus dispathaceus is species of flowering plant growing from a corm, with a native range from southern Turkey to northern Syria.

== Description ==
Crocus dispathaceus is a herbaceous perennial geophyte growing from a corm, which is relatively large for a crocus species. Corms are surrounded by fine reticulate tunics, which develop multi-layered, mat-forming, shredding sheathing leaves from past years of growth. The tunic rises above the corm and around the sheath of the flowers. Deep purple flowers, with veins; have a reddish, double basal spathe (a large sheathing bract enclosing the flower). Petals are narrow. The branches of the stigma are unusually short and do not rise above the throat of the flower and end below the bases of the anthers. The anthers are long, yellow, with reddish filaments. Corms produce 10 to 12 narrow leaves which grow during or shortly after flowering. C. dispathaceus blooms from September to November.
