= Crocus lydius =

Scientific classification
- Kingdom: Plantae
- Clade: Tracheophytes
- Clade: Angiosperms
- Clade: Monocots
- Order: Asparagales
- Family: Iridaceae
- Genus: Crocus
- Species: C. lydius

Binomial name
- Crocus lydius Kernd. & Pasche

Species of flowering plant

Crocus lydius is a species of flowering plant growing from a corm, native to western Turkey (Manisa).
