= Crocus angustifolius =

Scientific classification
- Kingdom: Plantae
- Clade: Tracheophytes
- Clade: Angiosperms
- Clade: Monocots
- Order: Asparagales
- Family: Iridaceae
- Genus: Crocus
- Species: C. angustifolius

Binomial name
- Crocus angustifolius Weston

Synonyms
- Crocus revolutus Haw.; Crocus roegnerianus K.Koch; Crocus susianus Ker Gawl.

Species of flowering plant

Crocus angustifolius, the cloth-of-gold crocus, is a species of flowering plant in the genus Crocus of the family Iridaceae, native to southern Ukraine and Armenia. It is a cormous perennial growing to 5 cm (2.0 in) tall and wide. The narrow grass-like leaves with silver central stripe appear in late winter or early spring. They are followed by bright yellow fragrant flowers with maroon blotches on the outer petals.

== Description ==
Crocus angustifolius is a herbaceous perennial geophyte growing from a corm. The globose (round but bulging somewhat in the middle) shaped corm has a coarsely reticulated tunic. The flowers are narrow, opening to a funnelform or radiate shape. The golden yellow flowers have glossy red-brown mottling and streaks on the outer surfaces. The flowers bloom while the grass-like leaves are present.

== Habitat ==
Native to the Crimea where it is found growing on hillsides, in juniper woods, and in areas of scrub; flowering occurs from February to March.

== Cultivation ==
C. angustifolius is widely cultivated, and has gained the Royal Horticultural Society's Award of Garden Merit. The cultivar 'Minor' has smaller, attractive darker flowers and blooms a little later than the species. The leaves are also more upright. It is winter hardy to USDA zone 5.
