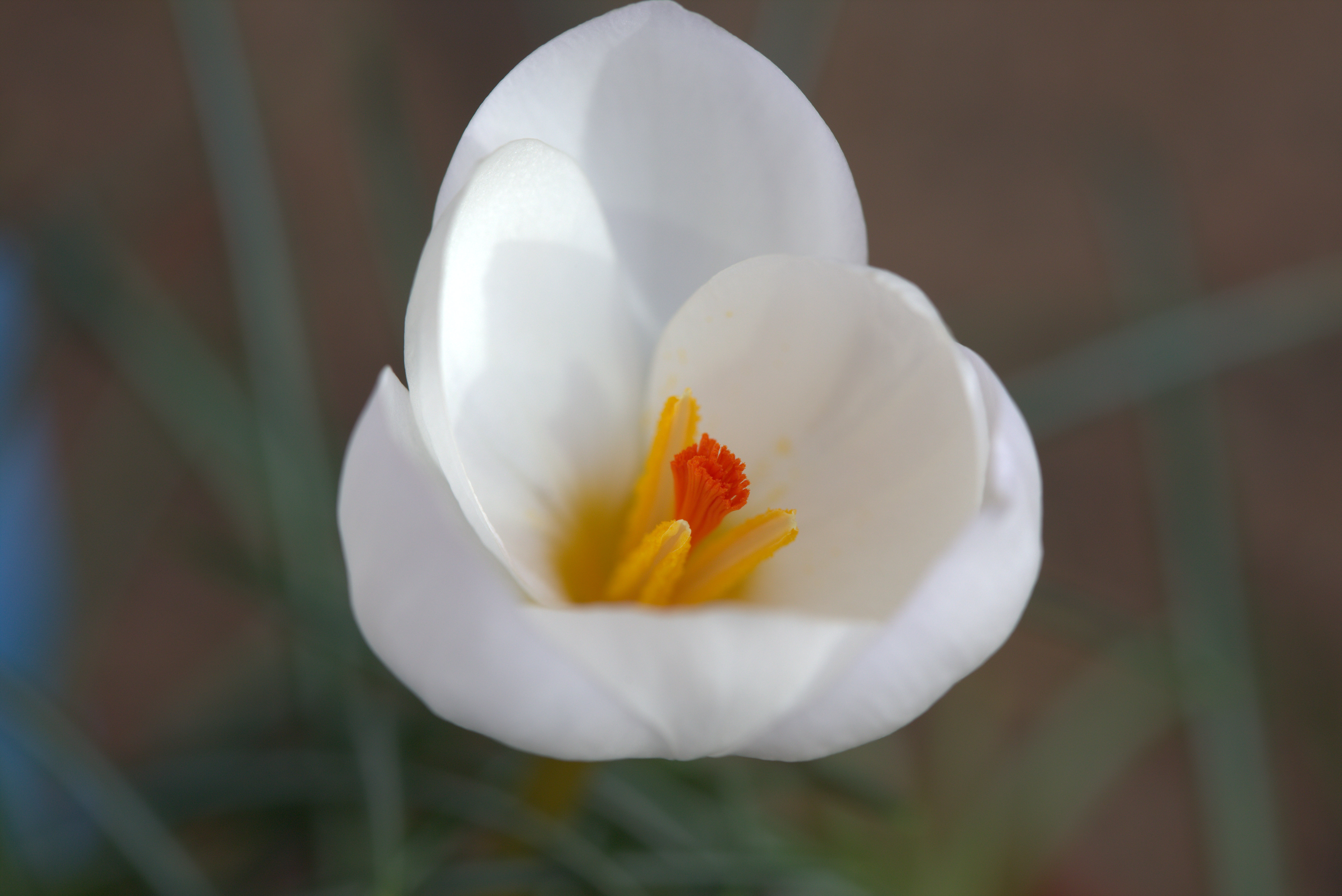

Scientific classification
- Kingdom: Plantae
- Clade: Tracheophytes
- Clade: Angiosperms
- Clade: Monocots
- Order: Asparagales
- Family: Iridaceae
- Genus: Crocus
- Species: C. niveus

Binomial name
- Crocus niveus Bowles

= Crocus niveus =

Species of flowering plant

Crocus niveus is a species of Crocus from Greece.
