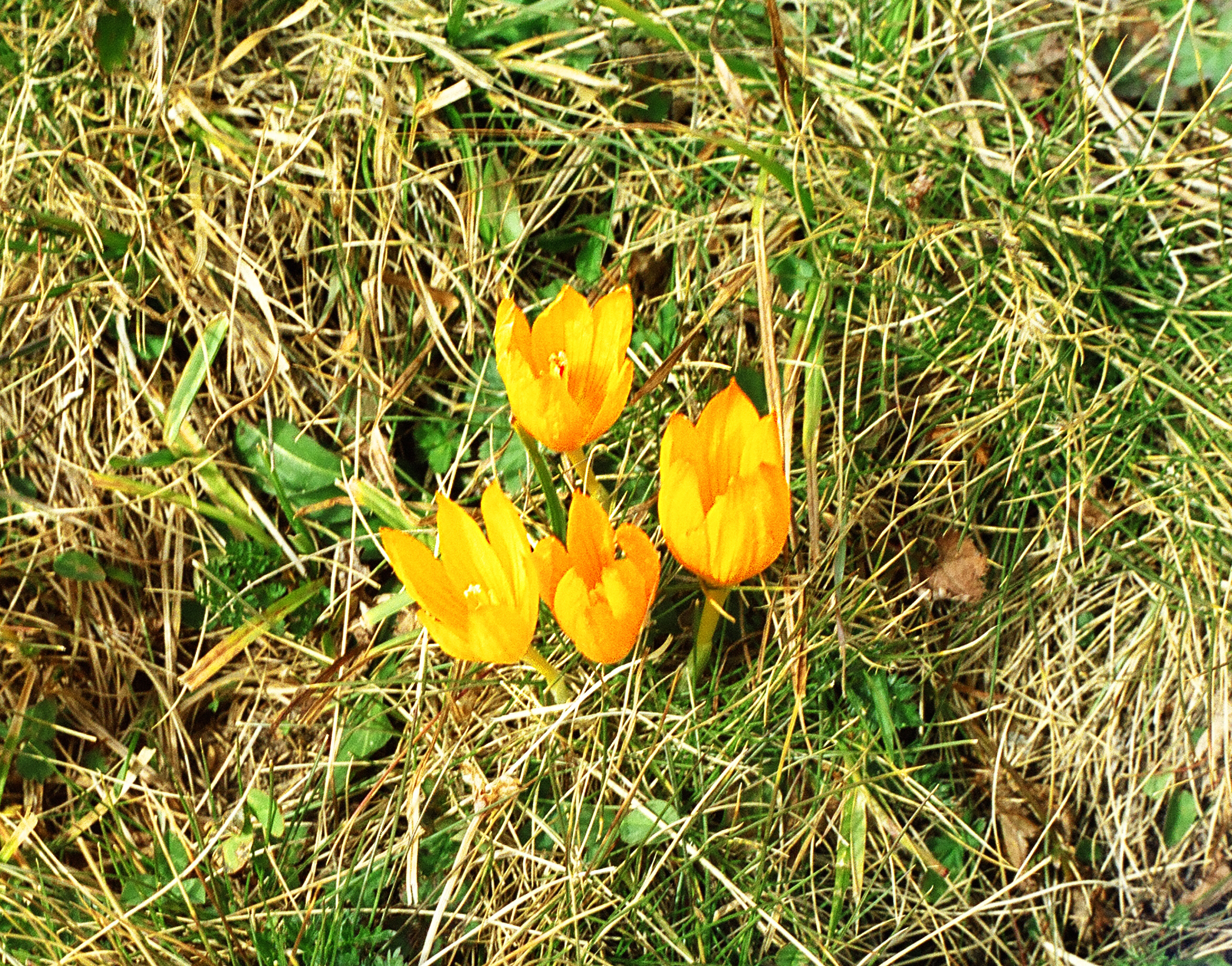

Scientific classification
- Kingdom: Plantae
- Clade: Tracheophytes
- Clade: Angiosperms
- Clade: Monocots
- Order: Asparagales
- Family: Iridaceae
- Genus: Crocus
- Species: C. scharojanii

Binomial name
- Crocus scharojanii Rupr.

= Crocus scharojanii =

Species of flowering plant

Crocus scharojanii is a species of flowering plant in the genus Crocus of the family Iridaceae. It is found from Northeastern Turkey to the Caucasus.
