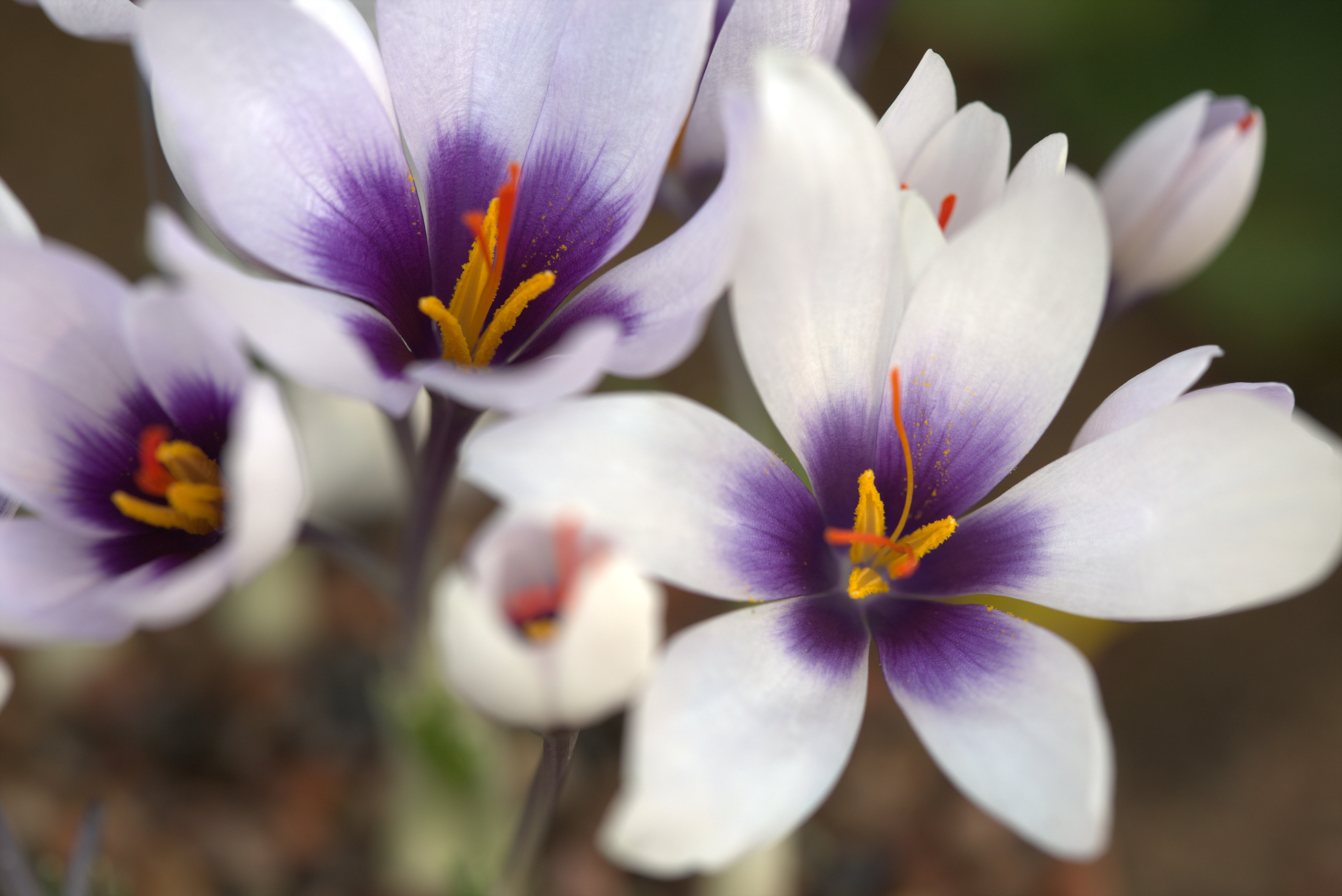

Scientific classification
- Kingdom: Plantae
- Clade: Tracheophytes
- Clade: Angiosperms
- Clade: Monocots
- Order: Asparagales
- Family: Iridaceae
- Genus: Crocus
- Species: C. mathewii

Binomial name
- Crocus mathewii Kernd. & Pasche

= Crocus mathewii =

Species of flowering plant

Crocus mathewii is a species of flowering plant in the genus Crocus of the family Iridaceae. It is a cormous perennial native to southwestern Turkey.
