= Crocus boulosii =

Scientific classification
- Kingdom: Plantae
- Clade: Tracheophytes
- Clade: Angiosperms
- Clade: Monocots
- Order: Asparagales
- Family: Iridaceae
- Genus: Crocus
- Species: C. boulosii

Binomial name
- Crocus boulosii Greuter

Species of flowering plant

Crocus boulosii is a species of flowering plant in the genus Crocus of the family Iridaceae. It is a cormous perennial native to Libya (Cyrenaica).
