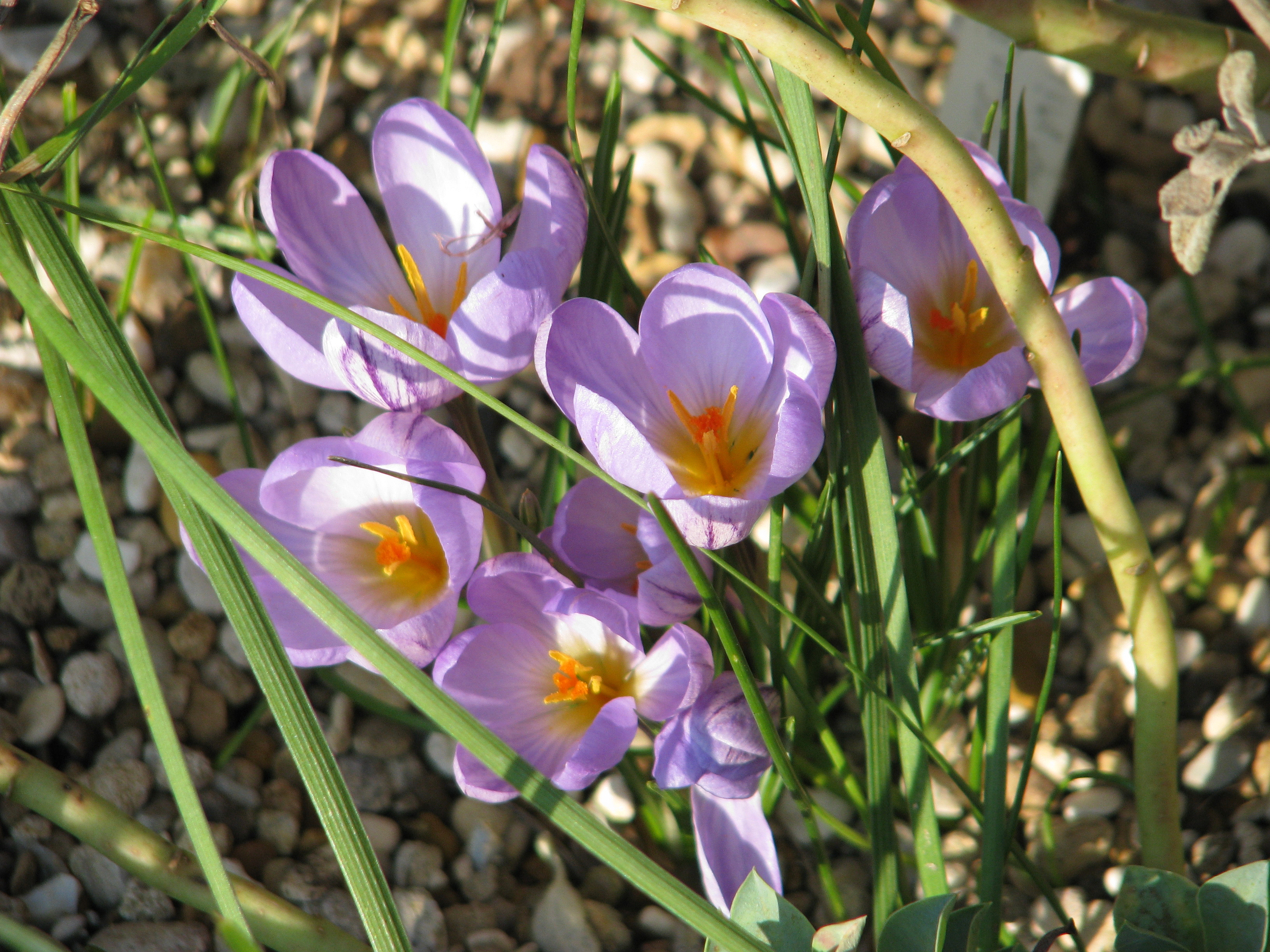
- Crocus kosaninii

Scientific classification
- Kingdom: Plantae
- Clade: Tracheophytes
- Clade: Angiosperms
- Clade: Monocots
- Order: Asparagales
- Family: Iridaceae
- Genus: Crocus
- Species: C. kosaninii

Binomial name
- Crocus kosaninii Pulevic

Synonyms
- Crocus kosaninii f. albidus Randjel.

= Crocus kosaninii =

Species of flowering plant

Crocus kosaninii is a species of flowering plant in the genus Crocus of the family Iridaceae. It is a cormous perennial native to southern Serbia to Kosovo.
