= Crocus hermoneus =

Scientific classification
- Kingdom: Plantae
- Clade: Tracheophytes
- Clade: Angiosperms
- Clade: Monocots
- Order: Asparagales
- Family: Iridaceae
- Genus: Crocus
- Species: C. hermoneus

Binomial name
- Crocus hermoneus Kotschy ex Maw

Species of flowering plant

Crocus hermoneus (Hebrew: כרכום החרמון) is a species of flowering plant in the genus Crocus of the family Iridaceae. It is a cormous perennial native to Lebanon, Syria, and Israel.

Crocus hermoneus has two subspecies:

- Crocus hermoneus subsp. hermoneus
- Crocus hermoneus subsp. palaestinus Feinbrun
