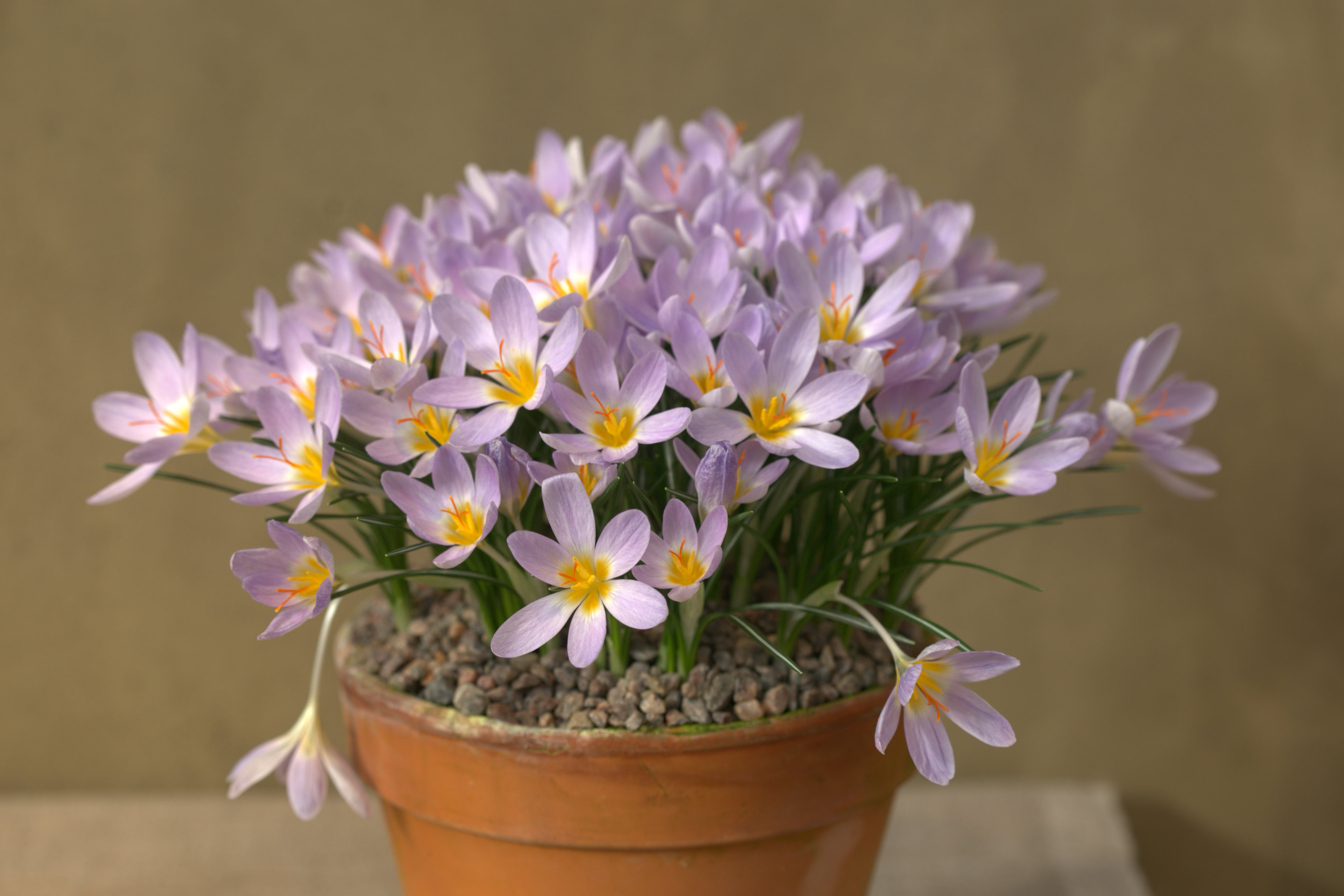
- At Gothenburg Botanical Garden

Scientific classification
- Kingdom: Plantae
- Clade: Tracheophytes
- Clade: Angiosperms
- Clade: Monocots
- Order: Asparagales
- Family: Iridaceae
- Genus: Crocus
- Species: C. paschei

Binomial name
- Crocus paschei Kerndorff

= Crocus paschei =

Species of flowering plant

Crocus paschei is a species of Crocus from Turkey.
