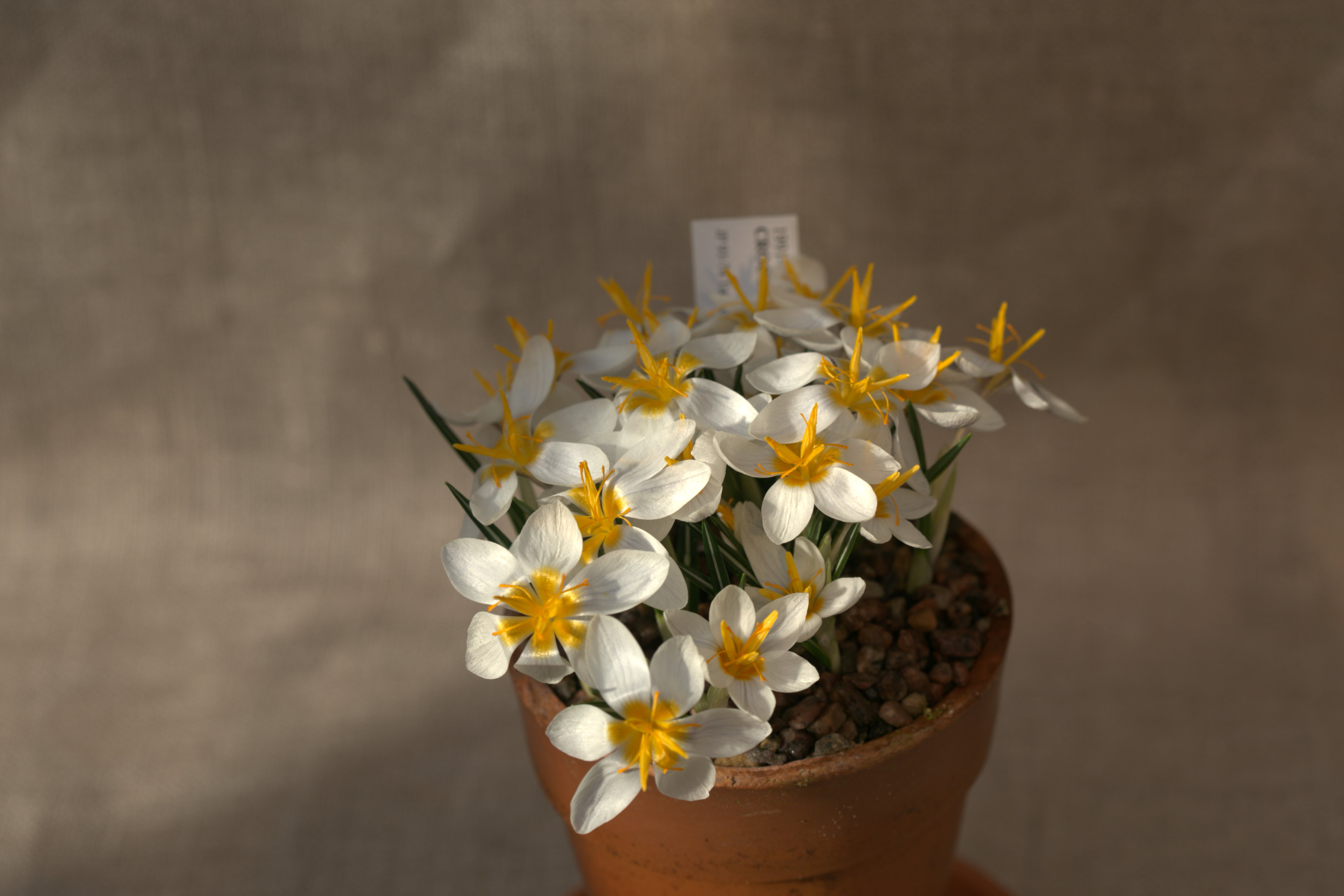

Scientific classification
- Kingdom: Plantae
- Clade: Tracheophytes
- Clade: Angiosperms
- Clade: Monocots
- Order: Asparagales
- Family: Iridaceae
- Genus: Crocus
- Species: C. candidus

Binomial name
- Crocus candidus E.D.Clarke

Synonyms
- Crocus fleischeri Baker; Crocus kirkii Maw; Crocus vittatus var. candidus (E.D.Clarke) Schloss. & Vuk.

= Crocus candidus =

Species of flowering plant

Crocus candidus is a species of flowering plant in the genus Crocus of the family Iridaceae. It is a cormous perennial native to Turkey.

It is found growing in woods and scrub, with flowering occurring in February and March.

Plants produce one or two very wide leaves, the much divided styles are yellow-orange.
