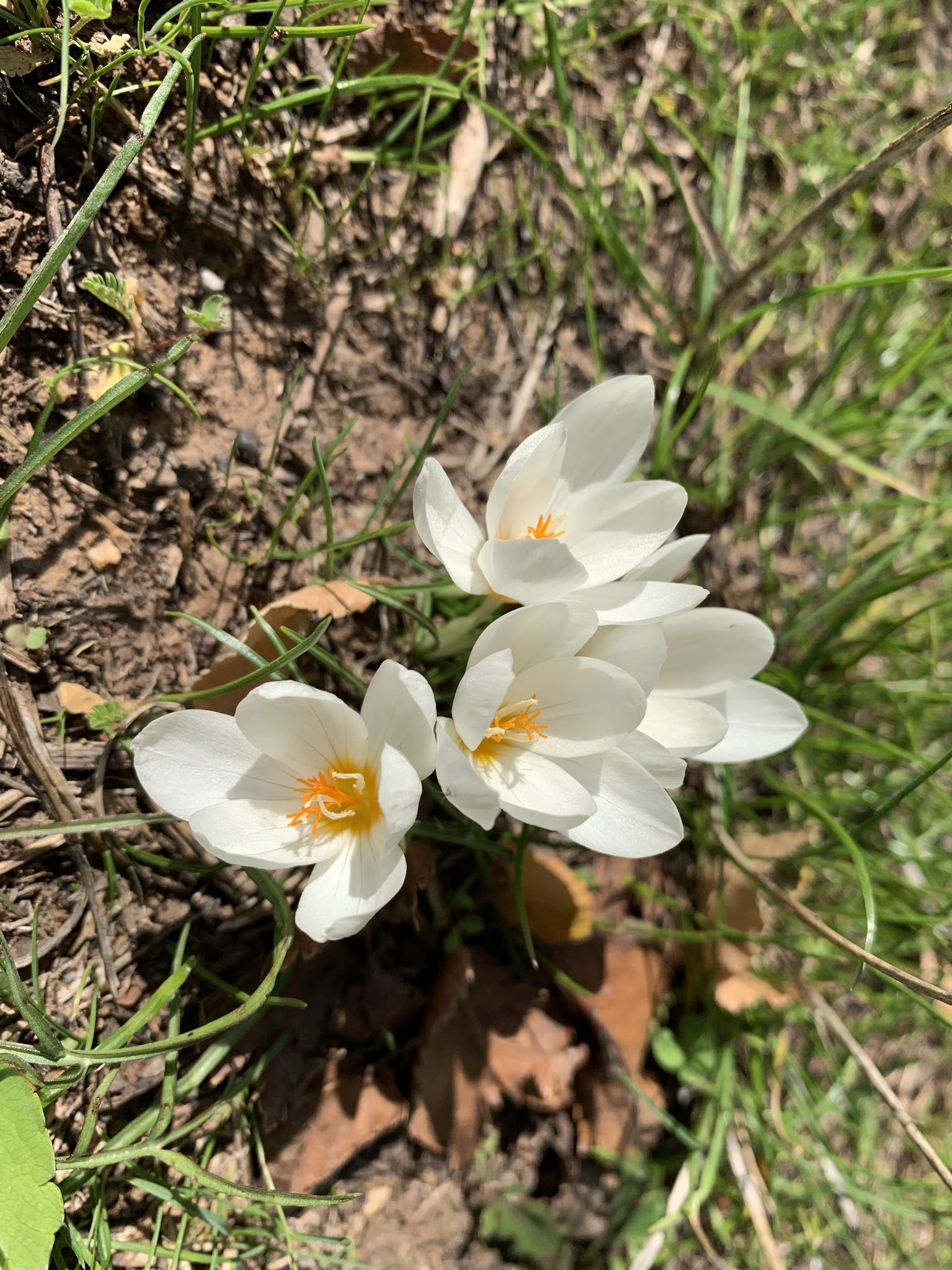
- flowering

Scientific classification
- Kingdom: Plantae
- Clade: Tracheophytes
- Clade: Angiosperms
- Clade: Monocots
- Order: Asparagales
- Family: Iridaceae
- Genus: Crocus
- Species: C. boryi

Binomial name
- Crocus boryi J.Gay

Synonyms
- Crocus boryanus Herb.; Crocus boryanus var. cephalonensis Herb.; Crocus laevigatus var. boryi (J.Gay) Nyman; Crocus laevigatus subsp. boryi (J.Gay) K.Richt.; Crocus boryi subsp. cretensis (Körn.) Nyman; Crocus cretensis Körn.; Crocus ionicus Herb.; Crocus marathonisius Heldr

= Crocus boryi =

Species of flowering plant

Crocus boryi is a species of flowering plant in the genus Crocus of the family Iridaceae. It is a cormous perennial native to western and southern Greece to Kriti (Crete).
