= Crocus robertianus =

Scientific classification
- Kingdom: Plantae
- Clade: Tracheophytes
- Clade: Angiosperms
- Clade: Monocots
- Order: Asparagales
- Family: Iridaceae
- Genus: Crocus
- Species: C. robertianus

Binomial name
- Crocus robertianus C.D.Brickell

Species of flowering plant

Crocus robertianus is a species of flowering plant in the genus Crocus of the family Iridaceae. It is a cormous perennial native to northwestern and central Greece.
