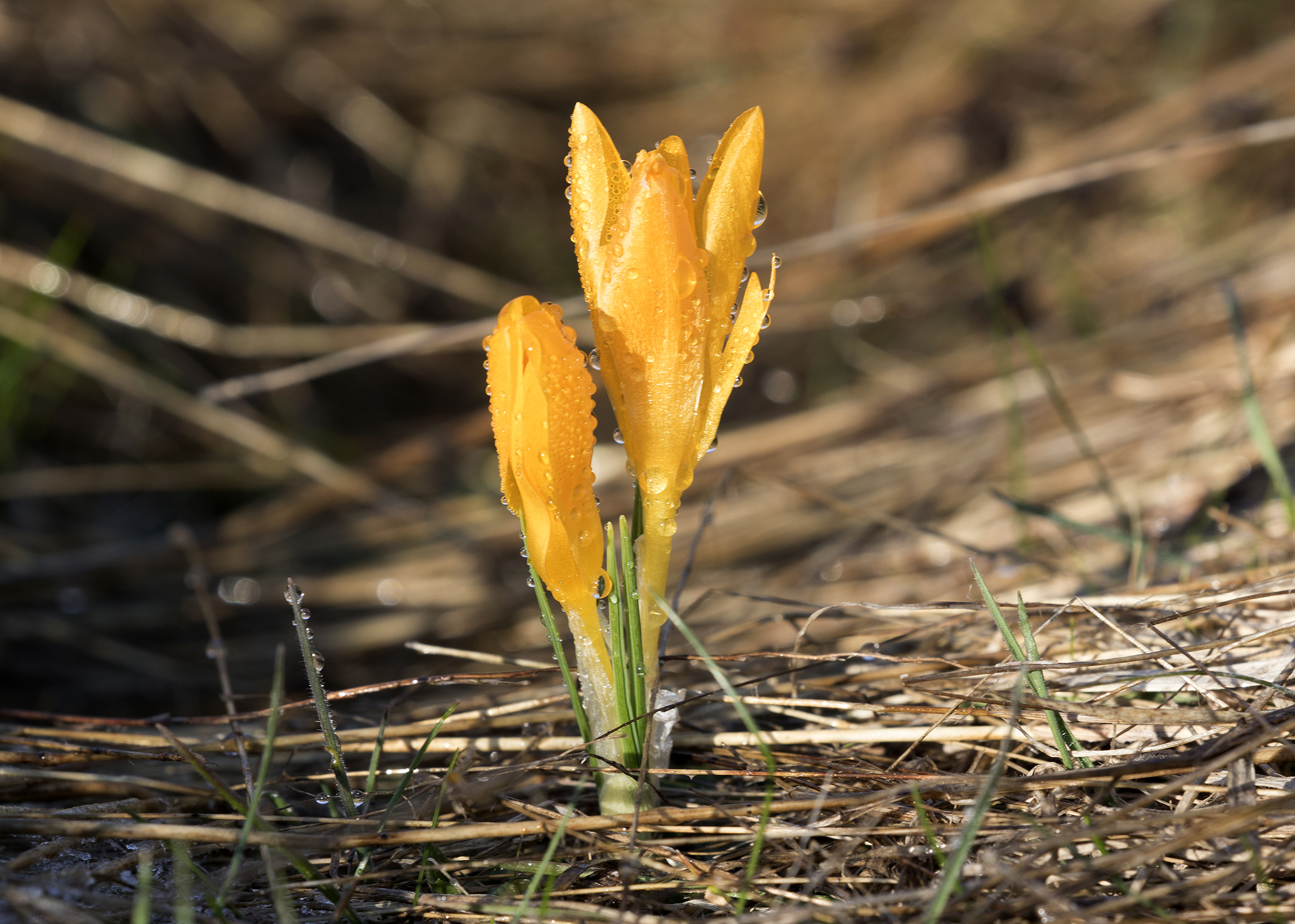
- Crocus danfordiae

Scientific classification
- Kingdom: Plantae
- Clade: Tracheophytes
- Clade: Angiosperms
- Clade: Monocots
- Order: Asparagales
- Family: Iridaceae
- Genus: Crocus
- Species: C. danfordiae

Binomial name
- Crocus danfordiae Maw

= Crocus danfordiae =

Species of flowering plant

Crocus danfordiae is a species of flowering plant in the genus Crocus of the family Iridaceae. It is a cormous perennial native to central and southern Turkey.
