= History of saffron =

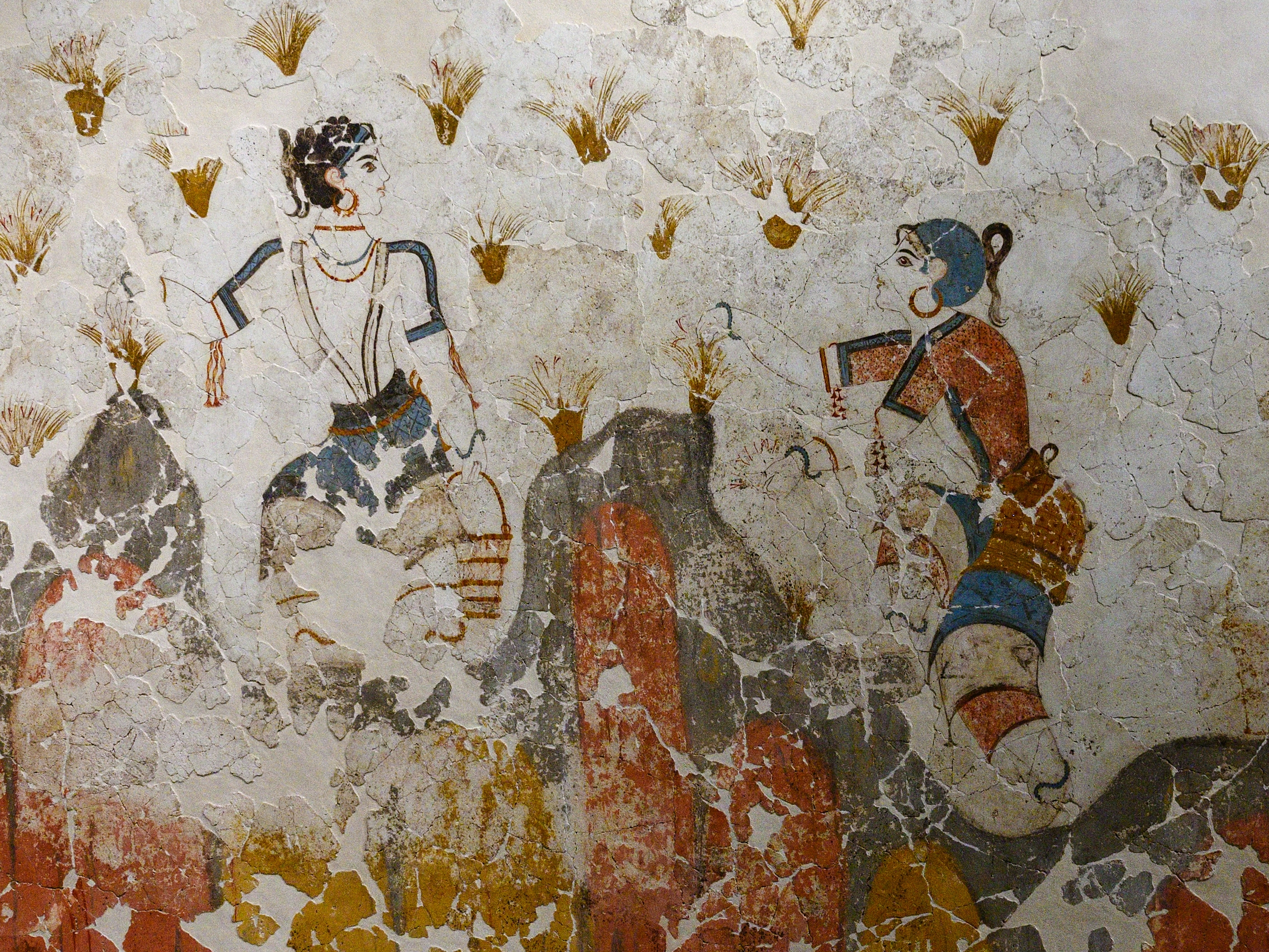
Saffron crocus flowers, represented as small red tufts, are gathered by two women in a fragmentary Minoan fresco from the excavation of Akrotiri on the Aegean island of Santorini.

Human cultivation and use of saffron spans more than 3,500 years and extends across cultures, continents, and civilizations. Saffron, a spice derived from the dried stigmas of the saffron crocus (Crocus sativus), has through history remained among the world's most costly substances. With its bitter taste, hay-like fragrance, and slight metallic notes, the apocarotenoid-rich saffron has been used as a seasoning, fragrance, dye, and medicine.

Crocus cartwrightianus, a plant native to mainland Greece, Euboea, Crete, Skyros and some islands of the Cyclades is a possible ancestor of saffron. A study reported in 2019 that the authors considered that a cross between two cytotypes of Crocus cartwrightianus was responsible for the emergence of Crocus sativus. This was probably a unique or very rare event as there is no genetic diversity in commercial saffron today. Another study in 2019 suggested that a population of Crocus cartwrightianus near Athens in Attica was the closest match to the theoretical ancestors of Crocus sativus.

C. thomasii and C. pallasii have also been suggested as possible ancestors. Various origins have been proposed, with suggestions that saffron originated in Iran (Persia), Greece, Mesopotamia and even Kashmir, Indian subcontinent.

Several wild species of Crocus are known to have been harvested for use as saffron. Crocus ancyrensis was used to make saffron in Sivas in Central Turkey, the corms were also eaten. Crocus cartwrightianus was harvested on Andros in the islands of the Cyclades, for medicinal purposes and the stigmas for making a pigment called Zafran. Crocus longiflorus stigmas were used for saffron in Sicily. Crocus thomasii stigmas were used to flavour dishes around Taranto, South Italy. In Syria the stigmas of an unknown wild species were collected by women and children, sun-dried and pressed into small tablets which were sold in the Bazaars.

The saffron crocus is now a triploid that is "self-incompatible" and male sterile; it undergoes aberrant meiosis and is hence incapable of independent sexual reproduction—all propagation is by vegetative multiplication via manual "divide-and-set" of a starter clone or by interspecific hybridisation. If C. sativus is a mutant form of C. cartwrightianus, then it may have emerged via plant breeding, which would have selected for elongated stigmas, in late Bronze Age Crete.

Humans may have bred C. cartwrightianus specimens by screening for specimens with abnormally long stigmas. The resulting saffron crocus was documented in a 7th-century BC Assyrian botanical reference compiled under Ashurbanipal, and it has since been traded and used over the course of four millennia and has been used as treatment for some ninety disorders. The C. sativus clone was slowly propagated throughout much of Eurasia, later reaching parts of North Africa, North America, and Oceania.

== Etymology ==
The word "saffron" immediately stems from the Latin word safranum via the 12th-century Old French term safran. The French was borrowed from Arabic زَعْفَرَان (za'farān), and ultimately from Persian زَرپَران (zarparān) which literally means "golden leaves".

The Latin form safranum is also the source of the Catalan safrà, Italian zafferano, but Portuguese açafrão, and Spanish azafrán come from the Arabic az-zaferán.

The Latin term crocus is certainly a Semitic loanword. It is adapted from the Aramaic form kurkema via the Arabic term kurkum and the Greek intermediate κρόκος krokos, which once again signifies "yellowish". The Sanskrit kunkumam might be ultimately the origin, or in some way related to the Semitic term.

== Minoan and Greco-Roman ==
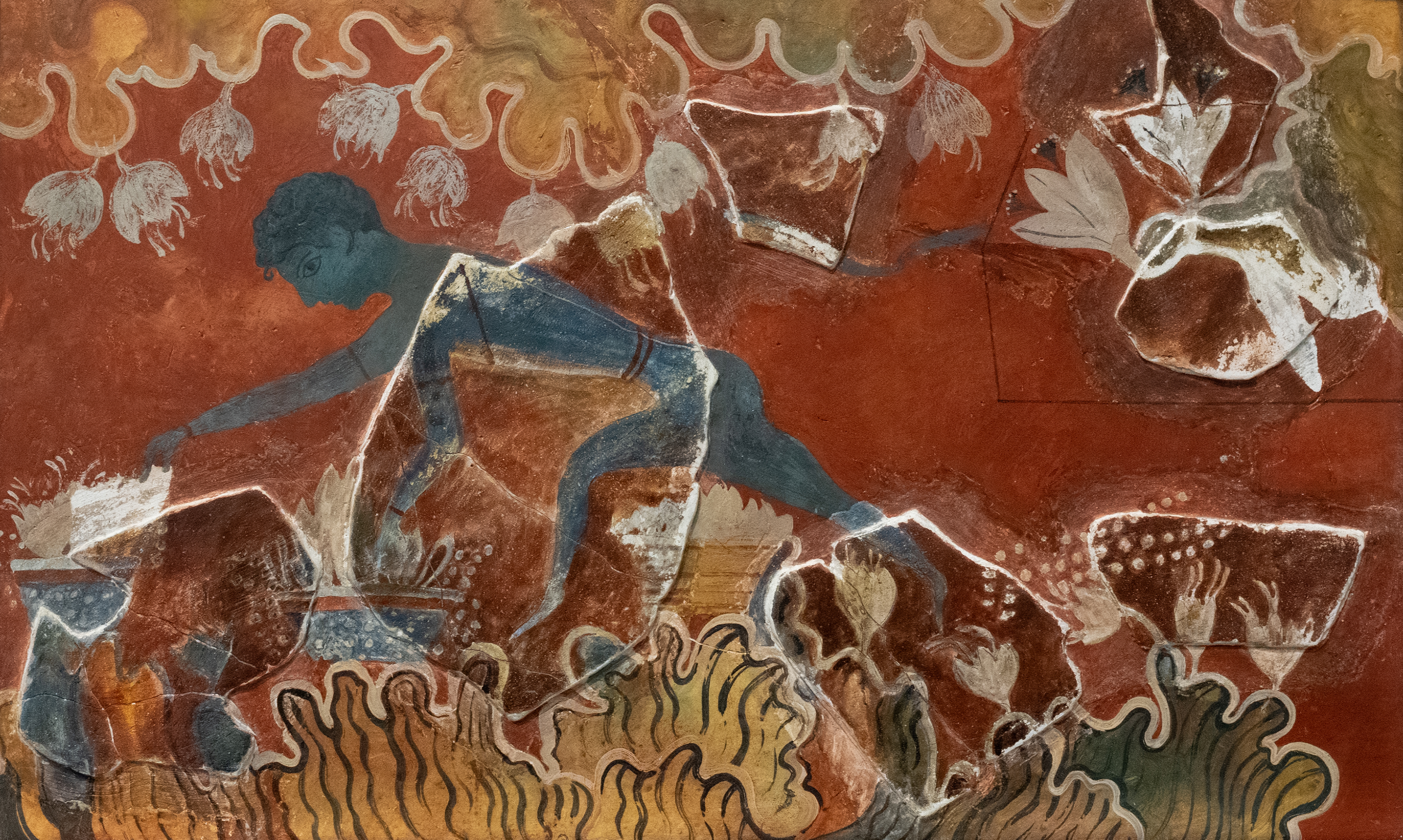
This inaccurate reconstruction of a Minoan fresco from Knossos in Crete depicts a man, which should be a monkey, gathering the crocus harvest.

Crocus cartwrightianus is a species of flowering plant in the family Iridaceae, native to Greece and Crete. C. cartwrightianus is the presumed wild progenitor of the domesticated triploid Crocus sativus – the saffron crocus. Saffron is the triploid form of a species found in Eastern Greece, Crocus cartwrightianus; it probably appeared first in Crete. An origin in Western or Central Asia, although often suspected, has been disproved by botanical research. Minoan depictions of saffron are now considered to be Crocus cartwrightianus.

Saffron played a significant role in the Greco-Roman pre-classical period bracketed by the 8th century BC and the 3rd century AD. The first known image of saffron in pre-Greek culture is much older and stems from the Bronze Age. A saffron harvest is shown in the Knossos palace frescoes of Minoan Crete, which depict the flowers being picked by young girls and monkeys. One of these fresco sites is located in the "Xeste 3" building at Akrotiri, on the Aegean island of Santorini—the ancient Greeks knew it as "Thera". These frescoes likely date from the 16th or 17th century BC but may have been produced anywhere between 3000 and 1100 BC. They portray a Minoan goddess supervising the plucking of flowers and the gleaning of stigmas for use in the manufacture of what is possibly a therapeutic drug. A fresco from the same site also depicts a woman using saffron to treat her bleeding foot. These "Theran" frescoes are the first botanically accurate visual representations of saffron's use as an herbal remedy. This saffron-growing Minoan settlement was ultimately destroyed by a powerful earthquake and subsequent volcanic eruption sometime between 1645 and 1500 BC. The volcanic ash from the destruction entombed and helped preserve these key herbal frescoes.

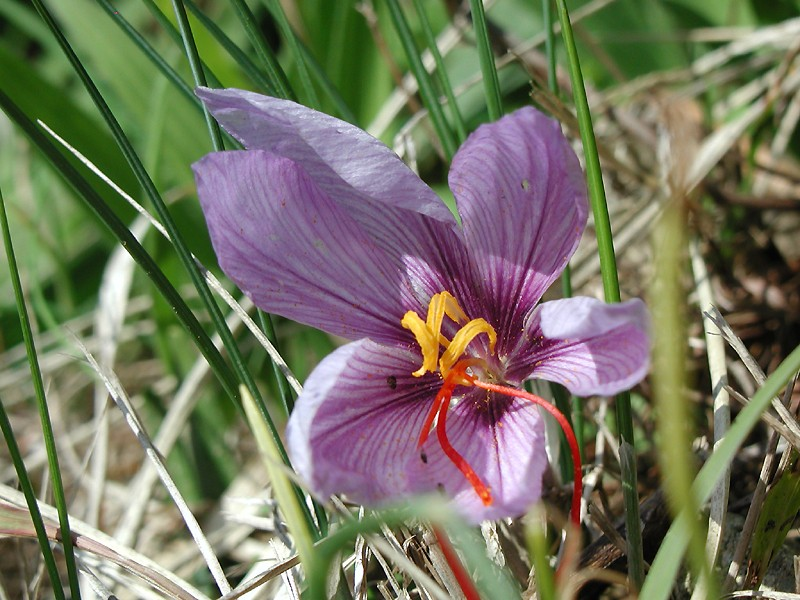
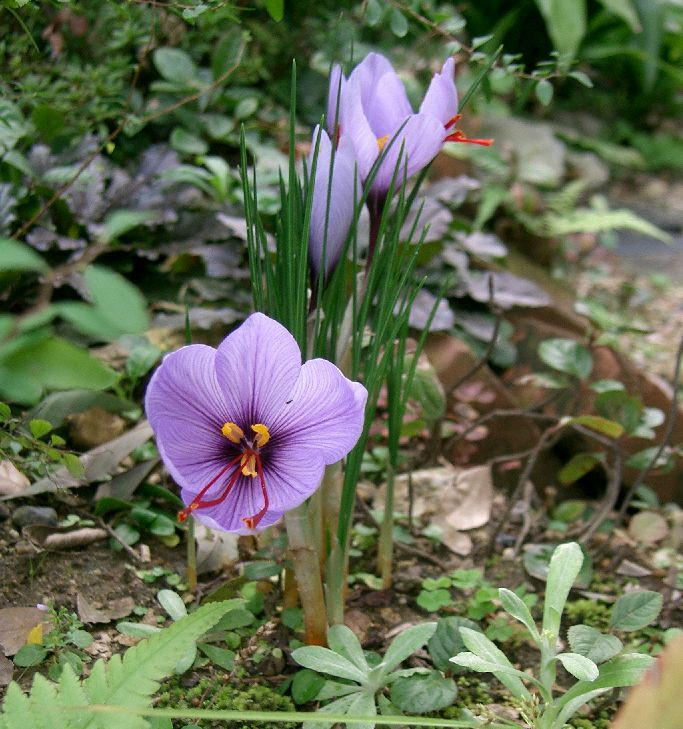
C. sativus.

Ancient Greek legends tell of brazen sailors embarking on long and perilous voyages to the remote land of Cilicia, where they traveled to procure what they believed was the world's most valuable saffron. The best-known Hellenic saffron legend is that of Crocus and Smilax: The handsome youth Crocus sets out in pursuit of the nymph Smilax in the woods near Athens; in a brief dallying interlude of idyllic love, Smilax is flattered by his amorous advances, but all too soon tires of his attentions. He continues his pursuit; she resists. She bewitches Crocus: he is transformed—into a saffron crocus. Its radiant orange stigmas were held as a relict glow of an undying and unrequited passion. The tragedy and the spice would be recalled later:

Crocus and Smilax may be turn'd to flow'rs,
And the Curetes spring from bounteous show'rs
I pass a hundred legends stale, as these,
And with sweet novelty your taste to please.

— Ovid, Metamorphoses.

In another variation, Crocus was the lover of the messenger god Hermes. Hermes accidentally killed his lover during a game with the discus, and thus turned the dying Crocus into a saffron flower, in an aetiological myth explaining the origin of the plant.

For the ancient Mediterraneans, saffron gathered around the Cilician coastal town of Soli was of top value, particularly for use in perfumes and ointments. Herodotus and Pliny the Elder, however, rated rival Assyrian and Babylonian saffron from the Fertile Crescent as best—to treat gastrointestinal or renal upsets. Greek saffron from the Corycian Cave of Mount Parnassus was also of note: the color offered by the Corycian crocus is used as a benchmark in the Argonautica of Apollonius Rhodius (Note: Argonautica of Apollonius Rhodius at Project Gutenberg.) and similarly with its fragrance in the epigrams of Martial.

Cleopatra of late Ptolemaic Egypt used a quarter-cup of saffron in her warm baths, as she prized its colouring and cosmetic properties. She used it before encounters with men, trusting that saffron would render lovemaking yet more pleasurable. Egyptian healers used saffron as a treatment for all varieties of gastrointestinal ailments: when stomach pains progressed to internal hemorrhaging, an Egyptian treatment consisted of saffron crocus seeds mixed and crushed together with aager-tree remnants, ox fat, coriander, and myrrh. This ointment or poultice was applied to the body. The physicians expected it to "[expel] blood through the mouth or rectum which resembles hog's blood when it is cooked". Urinary tract conditions were also treated with an oil-based emulsion of premature saffron flowers mixed with roasted beans; this was used topically on men. Women ingested a more complex preparation.

In Greco-Roman times saffron was widely traded across the Mediterranean by the Phoenicians. Their customers ranged from the perfumers of Rosetta, in Egypt, to physicians in Gaza to townsfolk in Rhodes, who wore pouches of saffron in order to mask the presence of malodorous fellow citizens during outings to the theatre. For the Greeks, saffron was widely associated with professional courtesans and retainers known as the hetaerae. Large dye works operating in Sidon and Tyre used saffron baths as a substitute; there, royal robes were triple-dipped in deep purple dyes; for the robes of royal pretenders and commoners, the last two dips were replaced with a saffron dip, which gave a less intense purple hue.

The ancient Greeks and Romans prized saffron as a perfume or deodoriser and scattered it about their public spaces: royal halls, courts, and amphitheatres alike. When Nero entered Rome they spread saffron along the streets; wealthy Romans partook of daily saffron baths. They used it as mascara, stirred saffron threads into their wines, cast it aloft in their halls and streets as a potpourri, and offered it to their deities. Roman colonists took saffron with them when they settled in southern Roman Gaul, where it was extensively cultivated until the AD 271 barbarian invasion of Italy. Competing theories state that saffron only returned to France with 8th-century Moors or with the Avignon Papacy in the 14th century.

== Middle Eastern and Persian ==
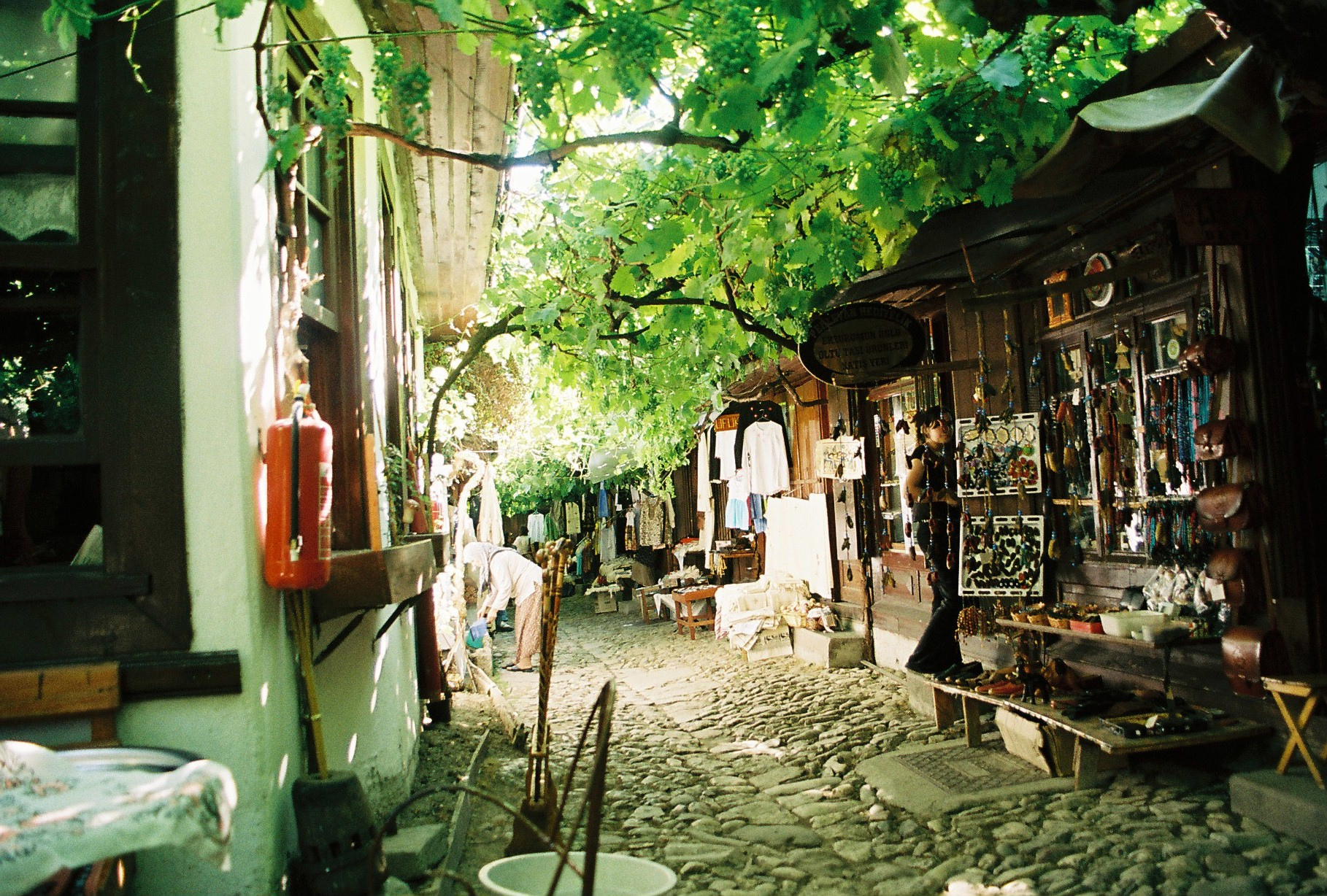
Safranbolu, Turkey.

Saffron-based pigments have been found in the prehistoric paints used to illustrate beasts in 50,000-year-old cave art found in modern-day Iraq, which was even then northwest of the Persian Empire. The Sumerians used saffron as an ingredient in their remedies and magical potions. Sumerians did not cultivate saffron. They gathered their stores from wild flowers, believing that divine intervention alone enables saffron's medicinal properties. Such evidence suggests that saffron was an article of long-distance trade before Crete's Minoan palace culture reached a peak in the 2nd millennium BC. Saffron was also honoured as a sweet-smelling spice over three millennia ago in the Hebrew Tanakh:

Your lips drop sweetness like honeycomb, my bride, syrup and milk are under your tongue, and your dress had the scent of Lebanon. Your cheeks are an orchard of pomegranates, an orchard full of rare fruits, spikenard and saffron, sweet cane and cinnamon.

— Song of Solomon

According to the Talmud saffron was also among the spices used in the Ketoret offered in the Temple in Jerusalem.

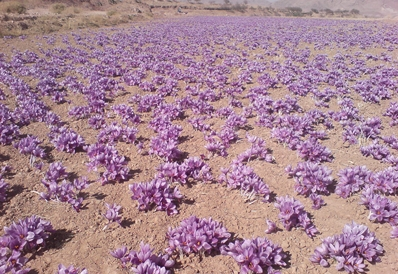
A field of saffron crocuses in Iran

In ancient Persia, saffron (Crocus sativus var. haussknechtii now called Crocus haussknechtii by botanists) was cultivated at Derbena and Isfahan in the 10th century BC. There, Persian saffron threads have been found interwoven into ancient Persian royal carpets and funeral shrouds. Saffron was used by ancient Persian worshippers as a ritual offering to their deities, and as a brilliant yellow dye, perfume, and a medicine. Thus, saffron threads would be scattered across beds and mixed into hot teas as a curative for bouts of melancholy. Indeed, Persian saffron threads, used to spice foods and teas, were widely suspected by foreigners of being a drugging agent and an aphrodisiac. These fears grew to forewarn travelers to abstain from eating saffron-laced Persian cuisine. In addition, Persian saffron was dissolved in water with sandalwood to use as a body wash after heavy work and perspiration under the hot Persian sun. Later, Persian saffron was heavily used by Alexander the Great and his forces during their Asian campaigns. They mixed saffron into teas and dined on saffron rice. Alexander personally used saffron sprinkled in warm bath water, taking after Cyrus the Great. Much like Cyrus, he believed it would heal his many wounds, and his faith in saffron grew with each treatment. He even recommended saffron baths for the ordinary men under him. The Greek soldiers, taken with saffron's perceived curative properties, continued the practice after they returned to Macedonia.

== East and South Asian ==
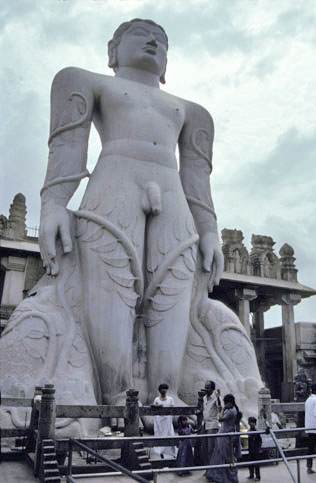
The Gomateshwara monolith is anointed with saffron every twelve years by thousands of devotees during the Mahamastakabhisheka.

Various conflicting accounts exist that describe saffron's first arrival in South and East Asia. The first of these rely on historical accounts gleaned from Persian records. These suggest to many experts that saffron, among other spices, was first spread to India via Persian rulers' efforts to stock their newly built gardens and parks. They accomplished this by transplanting the desired cultivars across the Persian empire. Phoenicians then began in the 6th century BC to market the new Kashmiri saffron by utilising their extensive trade routes. Once sold, Kashmiri saffron was used in the treatment of melancholy and as a fabric dye.

On the other hand, traditional Kashmiri legend states that saffron first arrived in the 11th or 12th century AD, when two foreign and itinerant Sufi ascetics, Khwaja Masood Wali and Hazrat Sheikh Shariffudin, wandered into Kashmir. The foreigners, having fallen sick, beseeched a cure for illness from a local tribal chieftain. When the chieftain obliged, the two holy men reputedly gave them a saffron crocus bulb as payment and thanks. To this day, grateful prayers are offered to the two saints during the saffron harvesting season in late autumn. The saints, indeed, have a golden-domed shrine and tomb dedicated to them in the saffron-trading village of Pampore, India. However, the Kashmiri poet and scholar Mohammed Yusuf Teng disputes this. He states that Kashmiris had cultivated saffron for more than two millennia.

Ancient Chinese Buddhist accounts from the mula-sarvastivadin monastic order (or vinaya) present yet another account of saffron's arrival in India. According to legend, an arhat Indian Buddhist missionary by the name of Madhyântika (or Majjhantika) was sent to Kashmir in the 5th century BC. Upon his arrival he seemingly sowed the first Kashmiri saffron crop. From there, saffron use spread throughout the Indian subcontinent. In addition to use in foods, saffron stigmas were also soaked in water to yield a golden-yellow solution that was used as a fabric dye.

Some historians believe that saffron first came to China with Mongol invaders by way of Persia. Saffron is mentioned in the ancient Chinese medical text Shennong Ben Cao Jing, believed to be from the 3rd century AD (but attributed to mythological emperor Shennong). Yet the Chinese were referring to saffron as having a Kashmiri provenance. The Chinese medical expert Wan Zhen wrote that "[t]he habitat of saffron is in Kashmir, where people grow it principally to offer it to the Buddha". Wan reflected on how saffron was used in his time: "The [saffron crocus] flower withers after a few days, and then the saffron is obtained. It is valued for its uniform yellow colour. It can be used to aromatise wine."

In modern times saffron cultivation has spread to Afghanistan due to the efforts of the European Union and the United Kingdom. Together they promote saffron cultivation among impoverished and cash-strapped Afghan farmers as an ideal alternative to lucrative—and illicit—opium production.

== Post-Classical European ==
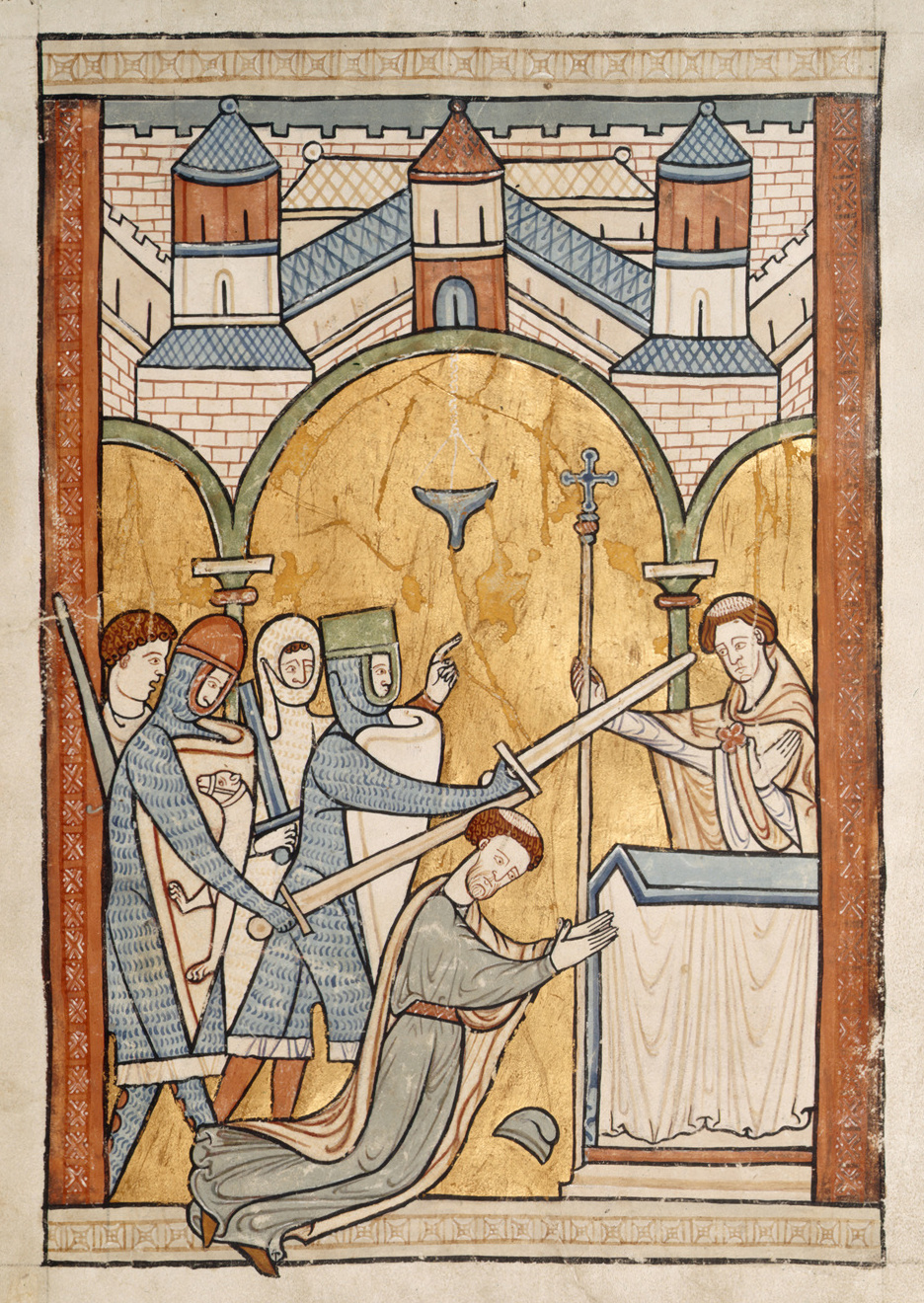
Medieval European illuminated manuscripts, such as this 13th-century depiction of Archbishop of Canterbury Thomas Becket's assassination, often used saffron dyes to provide hues of yellow and orange.

Saffron cultivation in Europe declined steeply following the fall of the Roman Empire. For several centuries thereafter, saffron cultivation was rare or non-existent throughout Europe. This was reversed when Moorish civilisation spread from North Africa to settle the Iberian peninsula as well as parts of France and southern Italy. One theory states that Moors reintroduced saffron corms to the region around Poitiers after they lost the Battle of Tours to Charles Martel in AD 732. Two centuries after their conquest of Spain, Moors planted saffron throughout the southern provinces of Andalucia, Castile, La Mancha, and Valencia.

In France, saffron cultivation probably started during the 13th century. Crocus sativus was likely introduced from Spain and from the Middle-East by pilgrims, merchants, and Knights. Its first uses are documented in the south-west of the Kingdom around 1250. It is indeed unlikely that the kings and religious orders didn't try growing Crocus sativus by that time: Saffron was rare, expensive, and demanded, and Crocus sativus could be farmed under France's latitudes. By the 14th century, the wide use of saffron for spicing and coloring food is documented in recipe books such as the "Viandier de Taillevent", written by the King's cook. Saffron was not only used as a coloring, but also to show off wealth in front of nobles. Because saffron was so rare and expensive, these nobles would give a great honor to the cooks who prepared the meals with these spices like saffron in them. And by the 15th century, local saffron farming is attested with taxes levied by the religious power, which reveal how important saffron crops must have been. For instance, in 1478, the saffron tax levied by the Bishop of Albi reached 1/12th of saffron production.

Saffron demand skyrocketed when the Black Death of 1347–1350 struck Europe. It was coveted by plague victims for medicinal purposes, and yet many of the farmers capable of growing it had died off. Large quantities of non-European saffron were therefore imported. The finest saffron threads from Muslim lands were unavailable to Europeans because of hostilities stoked by the Crusades, so Rhodes and other places were key suppliers to central and northern Europe. Saffron was one of the contested points of hostility that flared between the declining landed gentry and upstart and increasingly wealthy merchants. The fourteen-week-long "Saffron War" was ignited when one 800 lb (363 kg) shipment of saffron was hijacked and stolen by nobles. The load, which was en route to the town of Basel, would at today's market prices be valued at more than US$500,000. That shipment was eventually returned, but the wider 13th-century trade was subject to mass piracy. Thieves plying Mediterranean waters would often ignore gold stores and instead steal Venetian- and Genoan-marketed saffron bound for Europe. Wary of such unpleasantness, Basel planted its own corms. Several years of large and lucrative saffron harvests made Basel extremely prosperous compared to other European towns. Citizens sought to protect their status by outlawing the transport of corms out of the town; guards were posted to prevent thieves from picking flowers or digging up corms. Yet ten years later the saffron harvest had waned. Basel abandoned the crop.

The pivot of central European saffron trade moved to Nuremberg. The merchants of Venice continued their rule of the Mediterranean sea trade, trafficking varieties from Sicily, France and Spain, Austria, Crete and Greece, and the Ottoman Empire. Adulterated goods also made the rounds: those soaked in honey, mixed with marigold petals, or kept in damp cellars—all to add quick and cheap bulk. Irritated Nuremberg authorities passed the Safranschou code to de-louse the saffron trade. Adulterators were thus fined, imprisoned, and executed—by immolation. England was next to have its turn as a major producer. One theory has it that the crop spread to the coastal regions of eastern England in the 14th century AD during the reign of Edward III. In subsequent years saffron was fleetingly cultivated throughout England. Norfolk, Suffolk, and south Cambridgeshire were especially affected with corms. Rowland Parker provides an account of its cultivation in the village of Foxton during the 16th and 17th centuries, "usually by people holding a small amount of land"; an acre planted in saffron could yield a crop worth a kingly £6, making it "a very profitable crop, provided that plenty of unpaid labor was available; unpaid labor was one of the basic features of farming then and for another two centuries."

In France, saffron production became very important in the 17th and 18th centuries, reaching a few tons. By then, saffron farming had spread throughout the entire Kingdom. Saffron was especially grown in Albigeois, Angoumois, Gascony, Gâtinais, Normandy, Périgord, Poitou, Provence, and Quercy. Its mysterious decline started during the 18th century, possibly due to pandemic fungal diseases destroying bulbs and crops, to particularly cold winters, and to competing market from the Mediterranean countries.

In England, cultivation persisted only in the light, well-drained, and chalk-based soils of the north Essex countryside. The Essex town of Saffron Walden got its name as a saffron growing and trading centre; its name was originally Cheppinge Walden, and the culinary name change was effected to punctuate the importance of the crop to the townsfolk; the town's arms still feature blooms from the eponymous crocus. (Note: Image at the town council website of Saffron Walden.) Yet as England emerged from the Middle Ages, rising puritanical sentiments and new conquests abroad endangered English saffron's use and cultivation. Puritanical partisans favoured increasingly austere, unadorned, and unspiced foods. Saffron was also a labor-intensive crop, which became an increasing disadvantage as wages and time opportunity costs rose. And finally, an influx of more exotic spices from the far East due to the resurgent spice trade meant that the English, as well as other Europeans, had many more—and cheaper—seasonings to dally over.

This trend was documented by the Dean of Manchester, Reverend William Herbert. He collected samples and compiled information on many aspects of the saffron crocus. He was concerned about the steady decline in saffron cultivation over the course of the 17th century and the dawn of the Industrial Revolution; the introduction in Europe of easily grown maize and potatoes, which steadily took over lands formerly flush with corms, did not help. In addition, the elite who traditionally comprised the bulk of the saffron market were now growing increasingly interested in such intriguing new arrivals as chocolate, coffee, tea, and vanilla. Only in the south of France or in Italy and Spain, where the saffron harvest was culturally primal, did significant cultivation prevail.

== North American ==
Saffron made its way to the New World when thousands of Alsatian, German, and Swiss Anabaptists, Dunkards, and others fled religious persecution in Europe. They settled mainly in eastern Pennsylvania, in the Susquehanna River valley. These settlers, who became known as the Pennsylvania Dutch, were by 1730 widely cultivating saffron after corms were first brought to America—in a trunk. It was owned by German adherents of a Protestant church known as the Schwenkfelder Church. Schwenkfelders, as members were known, were great lovers of saffron, and had grown it back in Germany. Pennsylvania Dutch saffron was soon being successfully marketed to Spanish colonists in the Caribbean, while healthy demand elsewhere ensured that its listed price on the Philadelphia commodities exchange was set equal to that of gold.

However the War of 1812 destroyed many of the merchantmen that ferried American saffron abroad. Pennsylvanian saffron growers were afterwards left with surplus inventory, and trade with the Caribbean markets never recovered. Nevertheless, Pennsylvania Dutch growers developed many uses for the now abundant saffron in their own home cooking—cakes, noodles, and chicken or trout dishes. Saffron cultivation survived into modern times principally in Lancaster County, Pennsylvania.
