= Use of saffron =

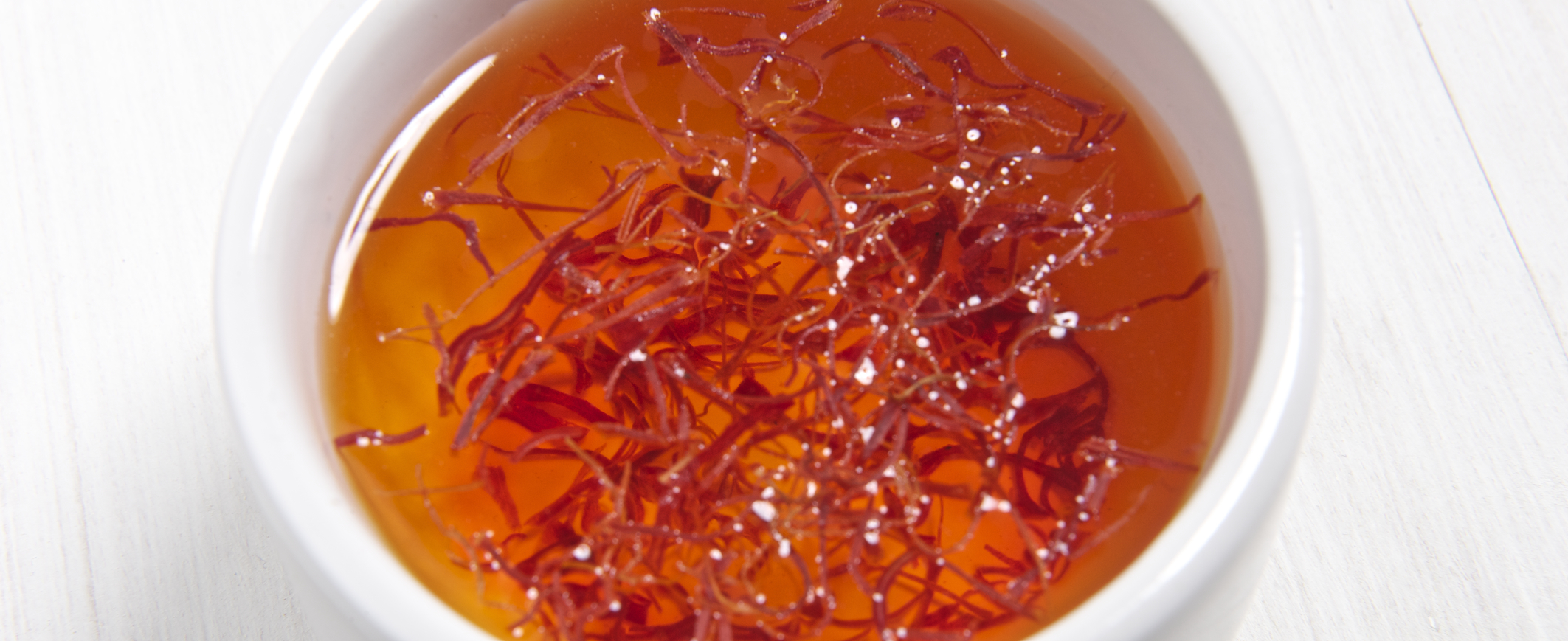
Prior to use in cuisine, saffron threads are soaked in water that is hot, but not boiling. This helps release the beneficial components.

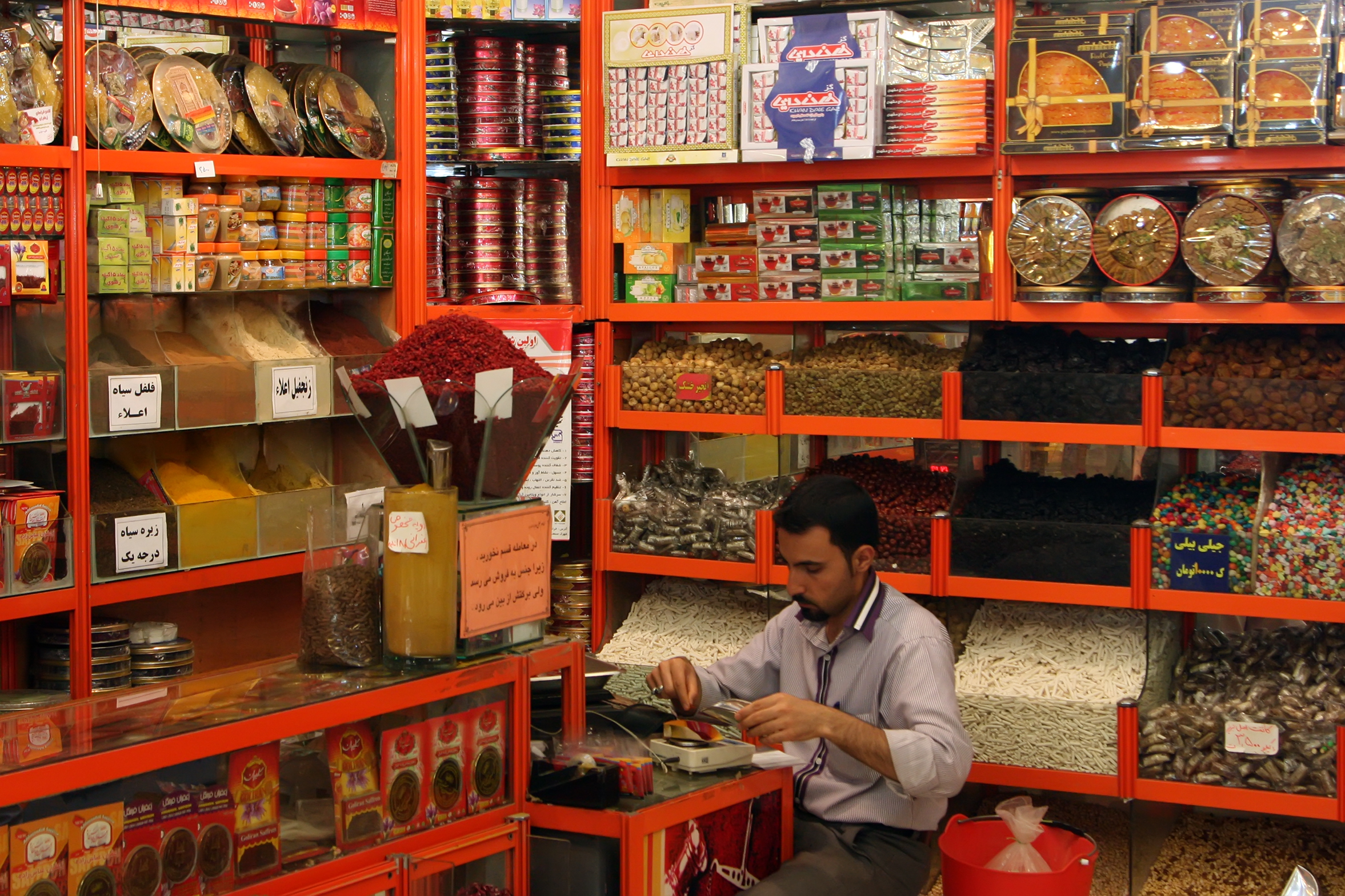
Sale of saffron and other spices in Iran

Saffron is a key seasoning, fragrance, dye, and medicine in use for over three millennia. One of the world's most expensive spices by weight, saffron consists of stigmas plucked from the vegetatively propagated and sterile Crocus sativus, known popularly as the saffron crocus. The resulting dried stigmas, also known as "threads", are distinguished by their bitter taste, hay-like fragrance, and slight metallic notes. The saffron crocus is unknown in the wild; its most likely precursor, Crocus cartwrightianus, originated in Crete or Central Asia; The saffron crocus is native to Southwest Asia and was first cultivated in what is now Greece.

From ancient to modern times the history of saffron is full of applications in food, drink, and traditional herbal medicine: from Africa and Asia to Europe and the Americas the brilliant red threads have long been prized in baking, curries, and liquor. It coloured textiles and other items and often helped confer the social standing of political elites and religious adepts. Ancient and medieval peoples believed saffron could be used to treat a wide range of ailments, from stomach upsets to the plague.

"Saffron, for example, was once less regarded than it is today because the crocus from which it is extracted was not particularly mysterious. It flourished in European locations extending from Asia Minor, where it originated, to Saffron Walden in England, where it was naturalised. Only subsequently, when its labour-intensive cultivation became largely centred in Kashmir, did it seem sufficiently exotic to qualify as one of the most precious of spices."

Saffron crocus cultivation has long centered on a broad belt of Eurasia bounded by the Mediterranean Sea in the southwest to India and China in the northeast. The major producers of antiquity—Iran, Spain, India, and Greece—continue to dominate the world trade.

The cultivation of saffron in the Americas was begun by members of the Schwenkfelder Church in Pennsylvania. In recent decades cultivation has spread to New Zealand, Tasmania, and California. Iran has accounted for around 90–93 percent of recent annual world production and thereby dominates the export market on a by-quantity basis.

== Culinary use ==
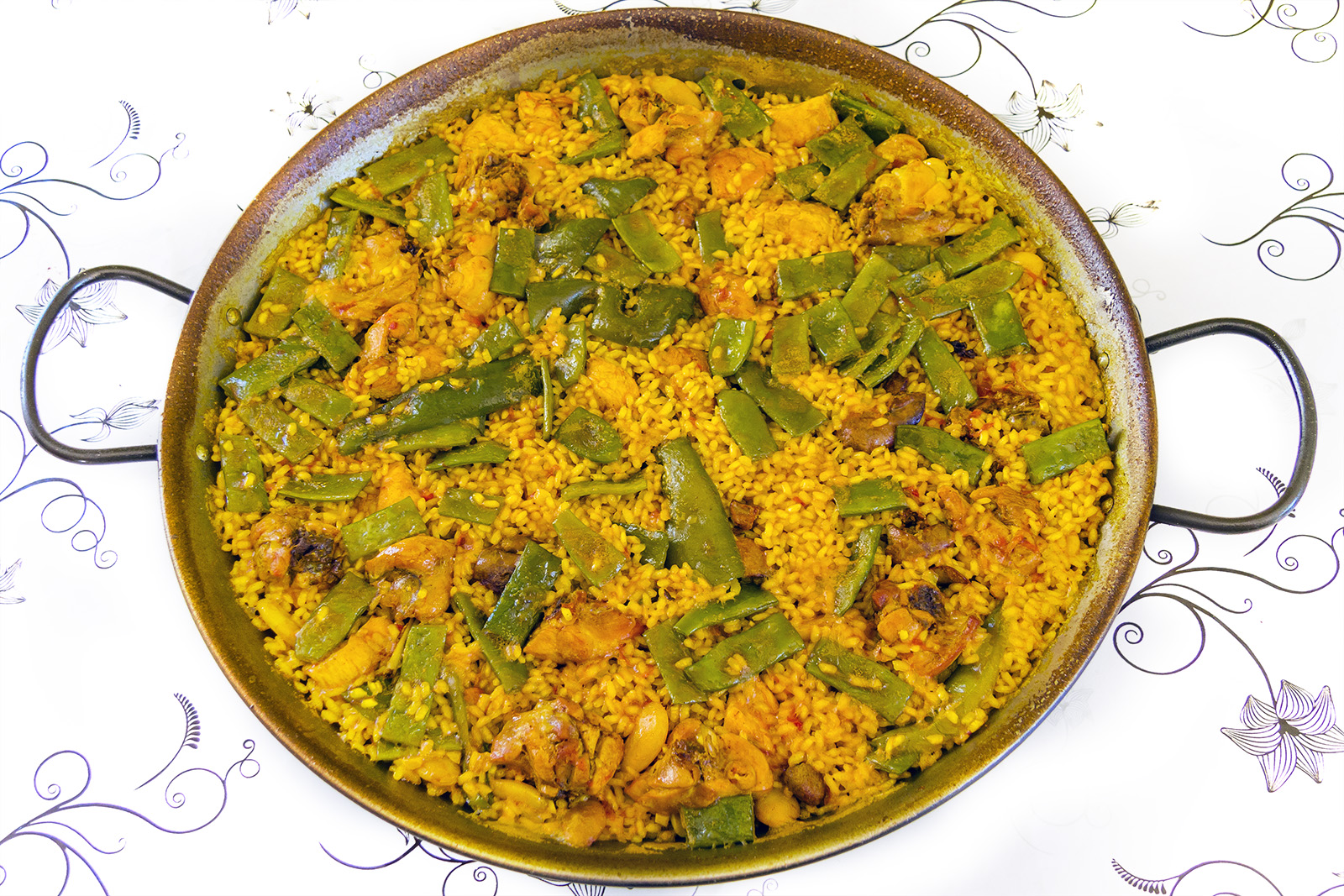
Saffron is one of three key ingredients in paella valenciana

Saffron features in European, North African, and Asian cuisines. Its aroma is described by taste experts as resembling that of honey, with woody, hay-like, and earthy notes; according to another such assessment, it tastes of hay, but only with bitter hints. Because it imparts a luminous yellow-orange hue, it is used worldwide in everything from cheeses, confectioneries, and liquors to baked goods, curries, meat dishes, and soups. In past eras, many dishes called for prohibitively copious amounts—hardly for taste, but to display wealth.

In Kashmir, saffron is used in kahwah, an aromatic tea made from saffron, almonds, walnuts, cardamom etc. It is also used in Kashmiri marriage and occasional cuisine namely Wazwan, where chicken is cooked in its heated aromatic solution, and the dish is known as konge kokur in local language.

Because of its high cost saffron was often replaced by or diluted with safflower (Carthamus tinctorius) or turmeric (Curcuma longa) in cuisine. Both mimic saffron's colour well, but have distinctive flavours. Saffron is used in the confectionery and liquor industries; this is its most common use in Italy. Chartreuse, izarra, and strega are types of alcoholic beverages that rely on saffron to provide a flourish of colour and flavour. Saffron threads are often crumbled and pre-soaked in water or sherry for several minutes prior to adding them to a dish. This process extracts the threads' colour and flavour into the liquid phase; powdered saffron does not require this step. The soaking solution is then added to the hot cooking dish, allowing even colour and flavour distribution, which is critical in preparing baked goods or thick sauces.

Threads are a popular condiment for rice in Spain and Iran, India and Pakistan, and other countries. Two examples of such saffron rice is the zarzuela fish-seafood stew and paella valenciana, a piquant rice-meat preparation. It is essential in making the French bouillabaisse, which is a spicy fish stew from Marseilles, and the Italian risotto alla milanese.

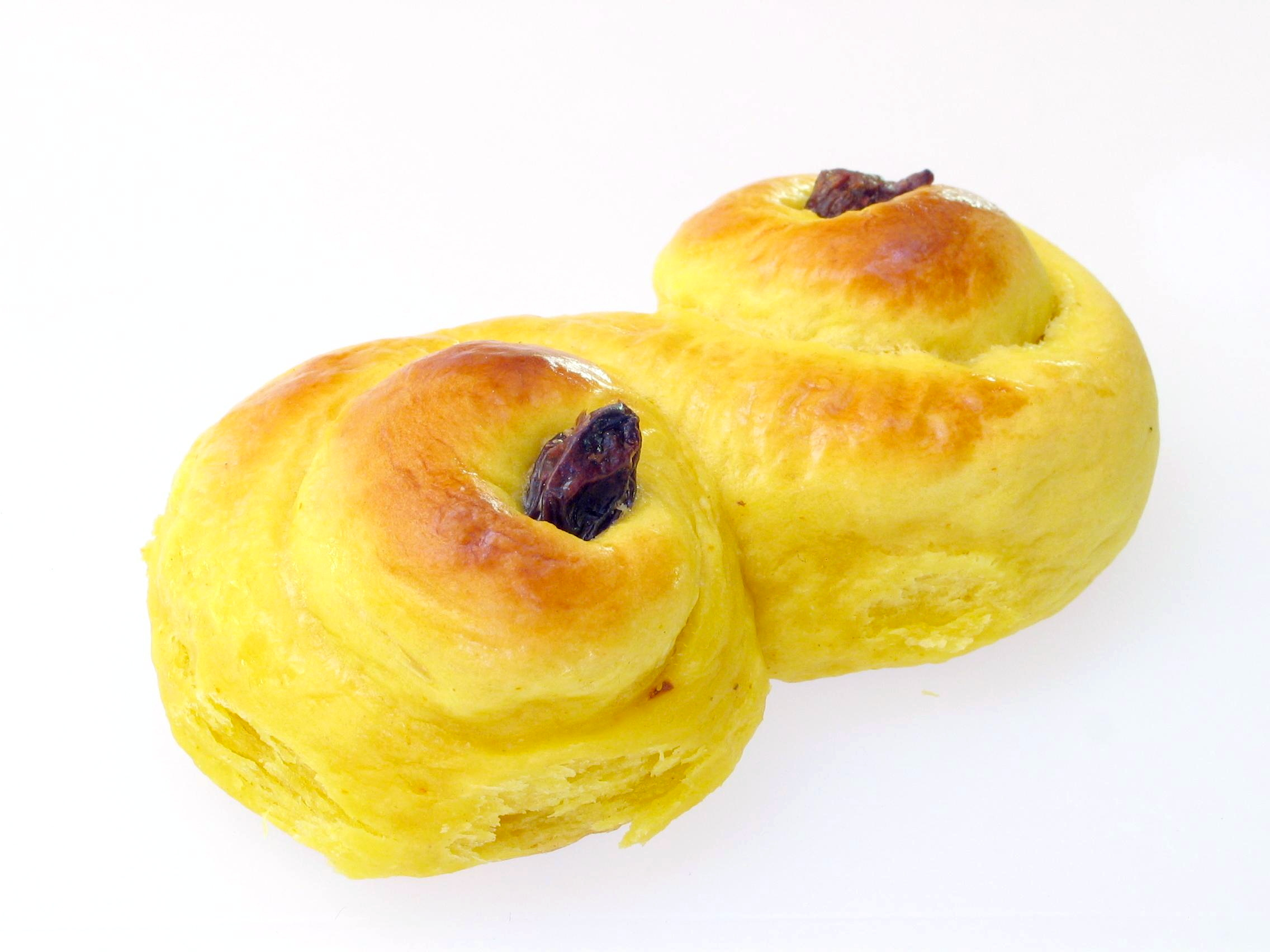
A Swedish-style saffron bun, traditionally consumed before Christmas

The saffron bun has Swedish and Cornish variants and in Swedish is known as lussekatt (literally "Lucy cat", after Saint Lucy) or lussebulle. The latter is a rich yeast dough bun that is enhanced with saffron, along with cinnamon or nutmeg and currants. They are typically eaten during Advent, and especially on Saint Lucy's Day. In England, the saffron "revel buns" were traditionally baked for anniversary feasts (revels) or for church dedications. In the West of Cornwall, large saffron "tea treat buns" signify Methodist Sunday School outings and activities.

In traditional dishes of La Mancha, Spain, the spice is almost ubiquitous.

Moroccans use saffron in many salty or sweet-and salty dishes. It is a key recipe in the chermoula herb mixture that flavors many Moroccan dishes. Due to its high price, it is mostly used while cooking for special occasions as well as in some Moroccan high-end recipes like the pastilla. Other Moroccan dishes cooked with saffron include some types of tajines, kefta (meatballs with tomato), mqualli (a citron-chicken dish), and mrouzia (succulent lamb dressed with plums and almonds).

Uzbeks use it in a special rice-based offering known as "wedding plov" (cf. pilaf). Saffron is also essential in chelow kabab, the Iranian national dish. The use of saffron in south Indian cuisine is perhaps best characterised by the eponymous Kesari bhath - a semolina based dessert from Karnataka. South Asian cuisines also use saffron in biryanis, which are spicy rice-vegetable dishes. (An example is the Pakki variety of Hyderabadi biryani.) Saffron spices subcontinental beef and chicken entrees and goes into many sweets, particularly in Muslim and Rajasthani fare. Modern technology has added another delicacy to the list: saffron ice cream. Regional milk-based sweets feature it, among them gulab jamun, kulfi, double ka meetha, and "saffron lassi"; the last is a sweet yogurt-based Jodhpuri drink that is culturally symbolic.

== Colouring ==
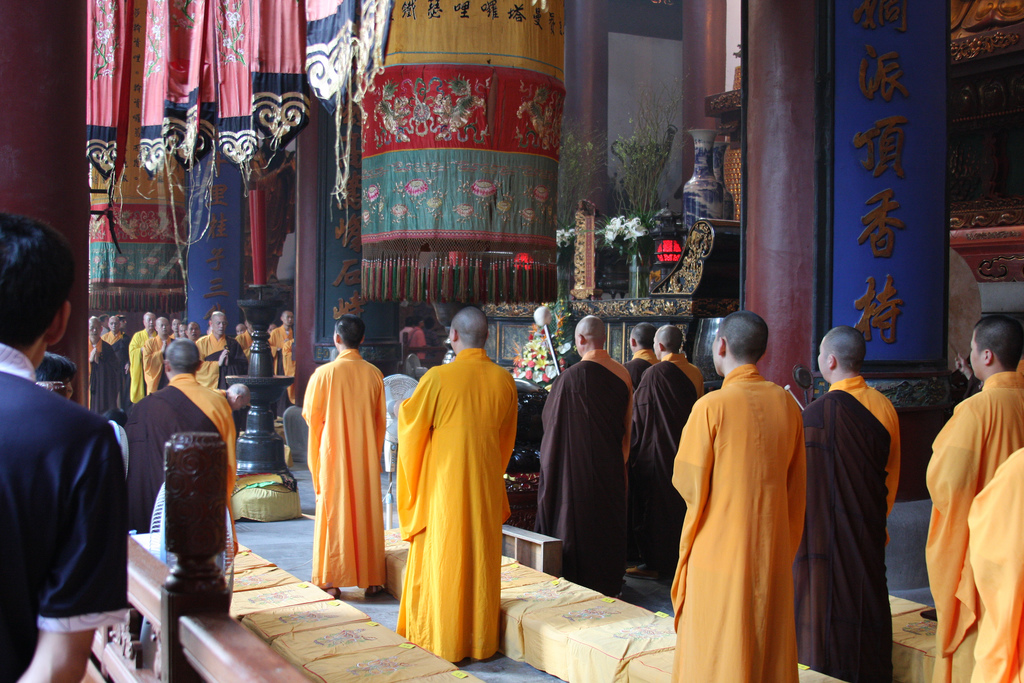
Buddhist monks in Hangzhou, China

Despite its high cost, saffron has been used as a fabric dye, particularly in China and India. It is in the long run an unstable colouring agent; the imparted vibrant orange-yellow hue quickly fades to a pale and creamy yellow. Even in minute amounts, the saffron stamens yield a luminous yellow-orange; increasing the applied saffron concentration will give fabric of increasingly rich shades of red. Clothing dyed with saffron was traditionally reserved for the noble classes, implying that saffron played a ritualised and status-keying role. It was originally responsible for the vermilion-, ochre-, and saffron-hued robes and mantles worn by Buddhist and Hindu monks. In medieval Ireland and Scotland, well-to-do monks wore a long linen undershirt known as a léine, which was traditionally dyed with saffron. In histology the hematoxylin-phloxine-saffron (HPS) stain and Movat's pentachrome stain are used as a tissue stain to make biological structures more visible under a microscope. Saffron stains collagen yellow.

There have been many attempts to replace saffron with a cheaper dye. Saffron's usual substitutes in food—turmeric and safflower, among others—yield a garishly bright yellow that could hardly be confused with that of saffron. Saffron's main colourant is the carotenoid crocin; it has been discovered in the less tediously harvested—and hence less costly—gardenia fruit. Research in China is ongoing.

== Perfumery ==
In Europe saffron threads were a key component of an aromatic oil known as crocinum, which comprised such motley ingredients as alkanet, dragon's blood (for colour), and wine (again for colour). Crocinum was applied as a perfume to hair. Another preparation involved mixing saffron with wine to produce a viscous yellow spray; it was copiously applied in sudoriferously sunny Roman amphitheatres—as an air freshener.

== See also ==
- History of saffron

== Sources ==
- Dalby, A. (2002), Dangerous Tastes: The Story of Spices (1st ed.), University of California Press, ISBN 978-0-520-23674-5
- Deo, B. (2003), "Growing Saffron—The World's Most Expensive Spice" (PDF), Crop and Food Research, no. 20, New Zealand Institute for Crop and Food Research, archived from the original (PDF) on 27 December 2005
- Dharmananda, S. (2005), "Saffron: An Anti-Depressant Herb", Institute for Traditional Medicine, archived from the original on 26 September 2006
- Grigg, D. B. (1974), The Agricultural Systems of the World (1st ed.), Cambridge University Press, ISBN 978-0-521-09843-4
- Hill, T. (2004), The Contemporary Encyclopedia of Herbs and Spices: Seasonings for the Global Kitchen (1st ed.), Wiley, ISBN 978-0-471-21423-6
- Kafi, M.; Koocheki, A.; Rashed, M. H.; Nassiri, M., eds. (2006), Saffron (Crocus sativus) Production and Processing (1st ed.), Science Publishers, ISBN 978-1-57808-427-2
- Major, J. (1892), "A History of Greater Britain as well England as Scotland", Publications of the Scottish History Society, vol. 10, University Press
- McGee, H. (2004), On Food and Cooking: The Science and Lore of the Kitchen, Scribner, ISBN 978-0-684-80001-1
- Negbi, M., ed. (1999), Saffron: Crocus sativusL., CRC Press, ISBN 978-90-5702-394-1
- Raghavan, S. (2006), "Saffron", Handbook of Spices, Seasonings, and Flavorings (2 ed.), CRC Press, ISBN 978-0-8493-2842-8
- Rubio-Moraga, A.; Castillo-López, R.; Gómez-Gómez, L.; Ahrazem, O. (2009), "Saffron Is a Monomorphic Species as Revealed by RAPD, ISSR, and Microsatellite Analyses", BMC Research Notes, vol. 2, doi:10.1186/1756-0500-2-189, PMC 2758891, PMID 19772674
- Willard, P. (2002), Secrets of Saffron: The Vagabond Life of the World's Most Seductive Spice, Beacon Press, ISBN 978-0-8070-5009-5
