= HOPS stain =

In histology, the HOPS stain is a way of marking tissue for microscopic examination. HOPS is an acronym for haematoxylin, orcein, phloxine and saffron.

== Appearance of tissues stained with HOPS ==
- nuclei appear blue (haematoxylin)
- elastin appears black (orcein)
- muscle appears red (phloxine)
- connective tissue appears yellow (saffron)
