= Saffron trade =

Saffron is one of the world's most expensive spices by weight due to its difficulty to harvest. Saffron consists of stigmas plucked from the vegetatively propagated and sterile Crocus sativus, known popularly as the saffron crocus. The resulting dried "threads" (Note: Another term that denotes the stigmas.) are distinguished by their bitter taste, hay-like fragrance, and slight metallic notes. The saffron crocus is unknown in the wild; its most likely precursor, Crocus cartwrightianus, originated in Crete or Central Asia; The saffron crocus is native to Southwest Asia, and is believed to have been first cultivated in Iran. Greece, Turkey, and Kashmir have also been suggested as possible sites of origin.

"Saffron, for example, was once less regarded than it is today because the crocus from which it is extracted was not particularly mysterious. It flourished in European locations extending from Asia Minor, where it originated, to Saffron Walden in England, where it was naturalised. Only subsequently, when its labour-intensive cultivation became largely centred in Kashmir, did it seem sufficiently exotic to qualify as one of the most precious of spices."

Saffron crocus cultivation has long centered on a broad belt of Eurasia bounded by the Mediterranean Sea in the southwest to Kashmir and China in the northeast. The major producers of antiquity—Iran, Spain, Kashmir and Greece—continue to dominate the world trade.

The cultivation of saffron in the Americas begun by members of the Schwenkfelder Church in Pennsylvania. In recent decades cultivation has spread to New Zealand, Tasmania, and California. However, Iran remains the largest producer of saffron worldwide, accounting for over 90% of all saffron production.

== Modern trade ==
=== Producers ===
Almost all saffron grows in a belt bounded by the Mediterranean in the west and mountainous Kashmir in the east. All other continents except Antarctica produce smaller amounts. In 1991, Some 300 t (300,000 kg) of whole threads and powder are gleaned yearly, of which 50 t (50,000 kg) is top-grade "coupe" saffron.

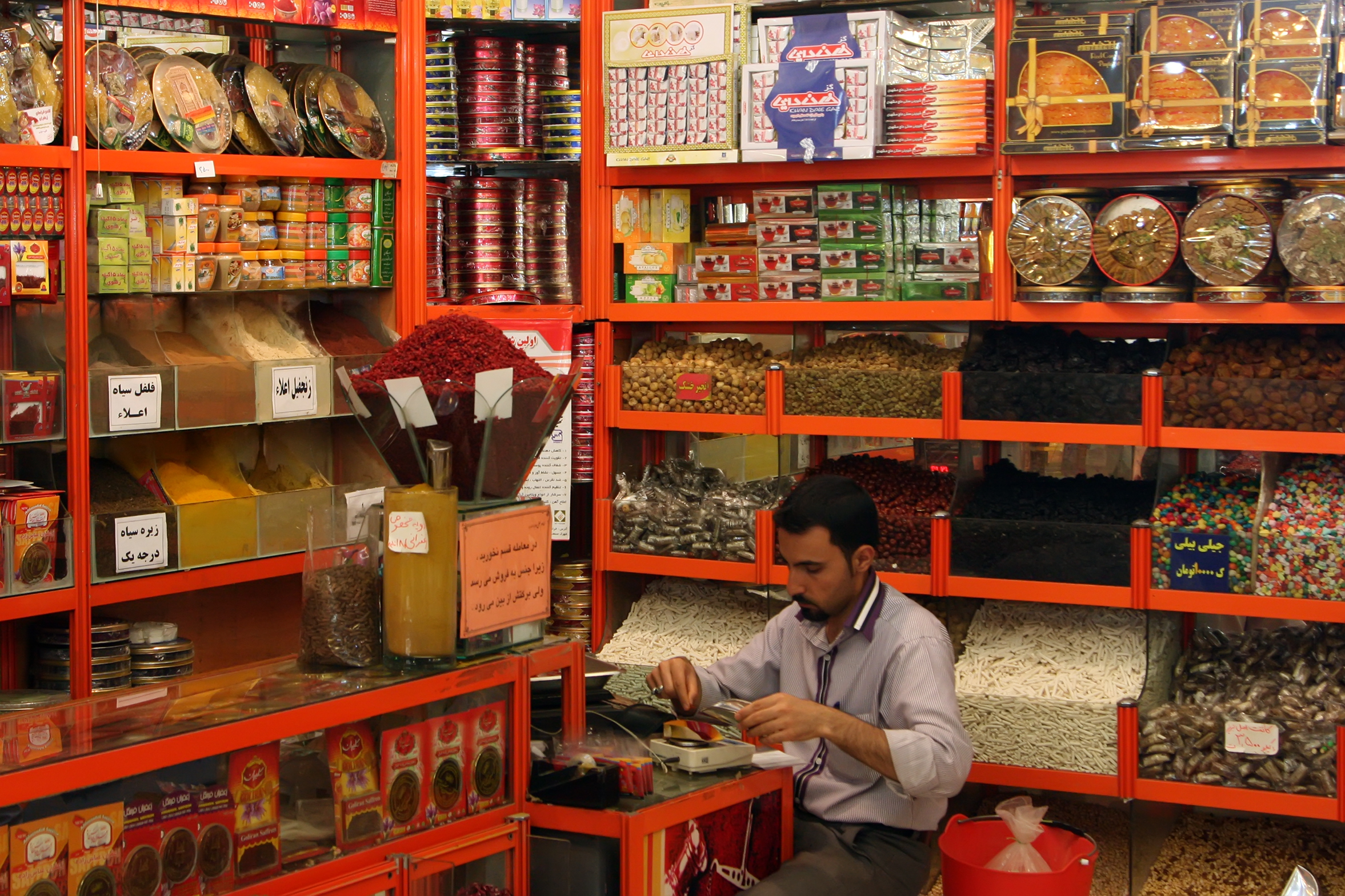
Sale of saffron and other spices in Iran

Iran is by far the world's most important producer with production of four hundred thirty tons in 2019, much of the Iranian crop was bound for export. Iran is not a member of the WTO due to the history of state affairs and political relations after the Islamic Revolution. Iran has remained a non-participant in the WTO since then, mainly because of US opposition. EU sanctions and restrictions are in place for trading with Iran today. The main production areas for Croci stigma lie in the Khorasan Province. Despite sanctions against Iran, and a loss of direct sales to the US, exports rebounded at the end of 2019, as markets for the valued product were expanded. Most of the Iranian saffron is exported to Turkey and Spain, where it is graded and resold into the global market. In 2020/21 production declined significantly due the work-intensive process of harvesting saffron, which was hindered by the COVID-19 pandemic. Farmers were forced to use the plant source as animal feed. Due to the economic sanctions, some production sites have also resorted to smuggling saffron out of the country in order to obtain higher profits from direct sales. Afghanistan comes second, which produced over 67 tons in 2023.

Indian Administered Kashmir is the third largest producer with annual production of twenty-two tons in 2019. Most of the region's saffron is grown in the more climatically suitable Pampore area of the Kashmir valley. Greece is fourth largest producer followed by Morocco and Spain. In restive Indian administered part of Kashmir it has waned. Despite numerous cultivation efforts in such countries as Austria, England, Germany, and Switzerland, only select locales continue the harvest in northern and central Europe. Among these is the small Swiss village of Mund, in the Valais canton, whose annual saffron output amounts to several kilograms. Microscale cultivation occurs in Tasmania, China, Egypt, France, Israel, Mexico, New Zealand, Turkey (especially Safranbolu), California, and Central Africa.

Kashmir saffron is renowned globally as a spice. It is used in cosmetics and for medicinal purposes. It has been associated with traditional Kashmiri cuisine and represents the rich cultural heritage of the region. The unique characteristics of Kashmir saffron are its longer and thicker stigmas, natural deep-red colour, high aroma, bitter flavour, chemical-free processing, and high quantity of crocin (colouring strength), safranal (flavour) and picrocrocin (bitterness). The saffron grown in Kashmir is mainly three types — ‘Lachha Saffron’, with stigmas just separated from the flowers and dried without further processing; ‘Mongra Saffron’, in which stigmas are detached from the flower, dried in the sun and processed traditionally; and ‘Guchhi Saffron’, which is the same as Lachha, except that the latter's dried stigmas are packed loosely in air-tight containers while the former has stigmas joined in a bundle tied with a cloth thread.

A protective geographical status, via the European Union, exists for growing, in the regions of, La Mancha, Spain, L'Aquila, Abruzzo, Italy, and around abouts Kozani, Western Macedonia, Greece. Kashmir has the All J&K Saffron Growers & Dealers Association which is run in order to promote fair trade and the rights of saffron farmers, and to promote trade of the spice.

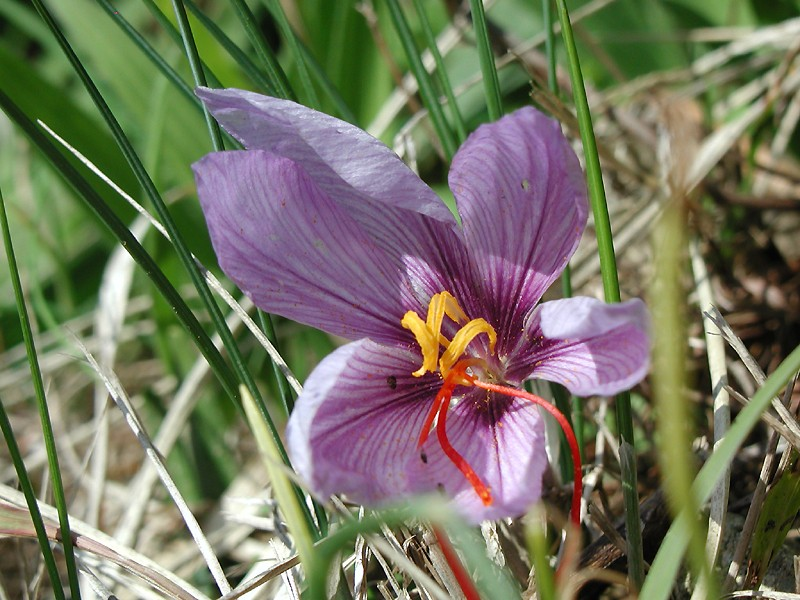
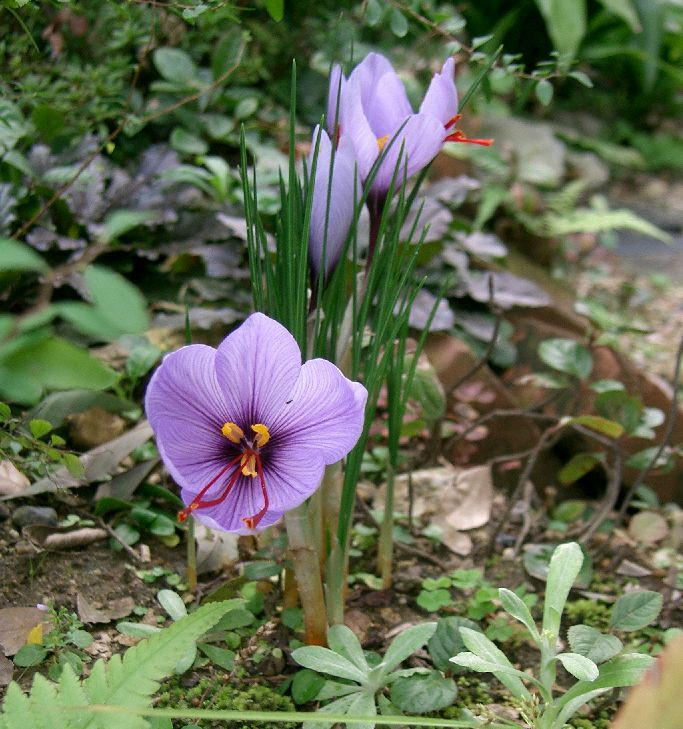
C. sativus.

=== Price ===
==== Factors determining costs ====
The high cost of saffron is due to the difficulty of manually extracting large numbers of minute stigmas, which are the only part of the crocus with the desired aroma and flavour. A large quantity of flowers need to be processed in order to yield marketable amounts of saffron. Obtaining 1 lb (0.45 kg) of dry saffron requires the harvesting of some 50,000 flowers, the equivalent of an association football pitch's area of cultivation, or roughly 7,140 m^{2} (0.714 ha). By another estimate some 75,000 flowers are needed to produce one pound of dry saffron. This too depends on the typical stigma size of each saffron cultivar. Another complication arises in the flowers' simultaneous and transient blooming. Since so many crocus flowers are needed to yield even derisory quantities of dry saffron, the harvest can be a frenetic affair entailing about forty hours of intense labour. In Kashmir, the thousands of growers must work continuously in relays over the span of one or two weeks throughout both day and night.

Once extracted, the stigmas must be dried quickly, lest decomposition or mould ruin the batch's marketability. The traditional method of drying involves spreading the fresh stigmas over screens of fine mesh, which are then baked over hot coals or wood or in oven-heated rooms where temperatures reach 30–35 °C (86–95 °F) for 10–12 hours. Afterwards the dried spice is preferably sealed in airtight glass containers. (Note: Pure saffron stigmas will often be mixed with stamens to add "dead"—read: "worthless"—weight. To put it mildly, stamens have little culinary appeal but will still add the signature yellow color of saffron. Powdered saffron should be red-orange rather than yellowish in colour.)

==== Actual prices ====
Per gram, prices range upward to $65, according to a year 2015 evaluation, £5.20 (La Mancha), according to an evaluation made during year 2014, and €20, according to a year 2011 evaluation. Bulk quantities of lower-grade saffron can reach upwards of US$500 per pound; retail costs for small amounts may exceed ten times that rate. In Western countries the average retail price is approximately US$1,000 per pound. Prices vary widely elsewhere, but on average tend to be lower. The high price is somewhat offset by the small quantities needed in kitchens: a few grams at most in medicinal use and a few strands, at most, in culinary applications; there are between 70,000 and 200,000 strands in a pound.

A price set during 2014 for Saffron grown within England was £15 for 0.2. grams, this being sold at Fortnum & Mason, and a gram priced at a value with a maximum of £75.

Saffron is somewhat renowned for sometimes costing more per weight than gold.

=== Buyers ===
Experienced saffron buyers often have rules of thumb when deliberating on their purchases. They may look for threads exhibiting a vivid crimson colouring, slight moistness, and elasticity. They reject threads displaying the telltale dull brick-red colouring—indicative of old stock—and broken-off debris collected at the container's bottom, indicative of age-related brittle dryness. Such aged samples are most likely encountered around the main June harvest season, when retailers attempt to clear out the previous season's old inventory and make room for the new season's crop. Buyers recommend that only the current season's threads be used. Reputable saffron wholesalers and retailers will indicate the year of harvest or the two years that bracket the harvest date; a late 2002 harvest would thus be shown as "2002/2003".

For the entire of 2013, the Guruvayur temple of India, known as particularly affluent, had an agreement with Jammu & Kashmir Agro Industries Development Corporation for the routine purchasing of an amount equal to 10 kg a month.

=== Market size and trends ===
Saffron use is projected to increase worldwide after 2019, from US$944 million to US$1.6 billion in 2027, particularly as a cosmetic and pharmaceutical ingredient in hair care products and dietary supplements. Its common use as an alternative to artificial colorings in ethnic cooking and textiles have further boosted projected sales for the spice. Constraints in supply due to sanctions against Iran, and high production costs will likely lead to increased prices as global demand for saffron will almost double in the next decade.

== See also ==
- Use of saffron
