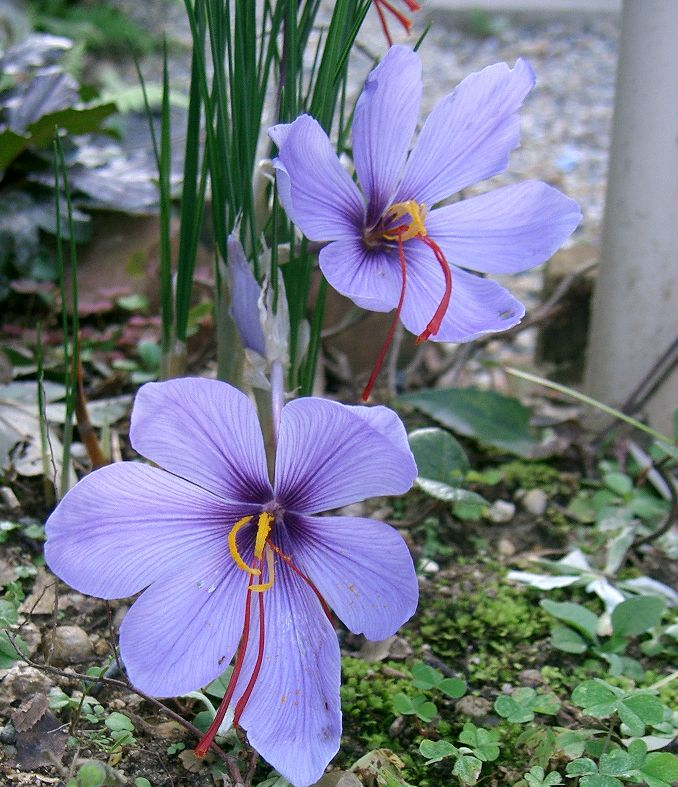
- Flowers showing crimson stigmas

Scientific classification
- Kingdom: Plantae
- Clade: Embryophytes
- Clade: Tracheophytes
- Clade: Angiosperms
- Clade: Monocots
- Order: Asparagales
- Family: Iridaceae
- Genus: Crocus
- Species: C. sativus

Binomial name
- Crocus sativus L.

Synonyms
- Crocus autumnalis Sm. nom. illeg.; Crocus officinalis (L.) Honck.; Crocus orsinii Parl.; Crocus pendulus Stokes; Crocus setifolius Stokes; Geanthus autumnalis Raf.; Safran officinarum Medik.

= Crocus sativus =

Saffron crocus

Species of flowering plant

Crocus sativus, commonly known as saffron crocus or autumn crocus, is a species of flowering plant in the iris family Iridaceae. A cormous autumn-flowering cultivated perennial, unknown in the wild, it is best known for the culinary use of its floral stigmas as the spice saffron. Human cultivation of saffron crocus and the trade and use of saffron have endured for more than 3,500 years and span different cultures, continents, and civilizations.

== Common names ==
The plant is most commonly known as the saffron crocus. The alternative name autumn crocus is also used for species in the Colchicum genus, which are not closely related but strongly resemble the true crocuses; in particular, the superficially similar species Colchicum autumnale is sometimes even referred to as meadow saffron. However, the true crocuses have three stamens and one style supporting three long stigmas, while colchicums have six stamens and three styles; and belong to a different family, Colchicaceae. Colchicums are also toxic, making it particularly crucial to distinguish them from the saffron crocus.

== Description ==
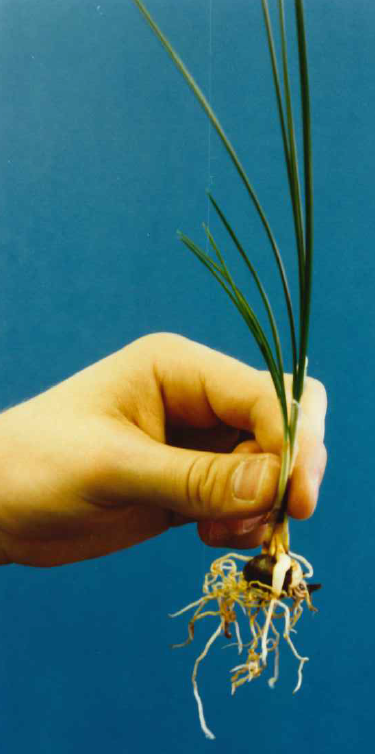
Plant growing from a developed corm.

Crocus sativus is a perennial herb that grows about 10 to 30 cm high. It develops as an underground corm, which produces leaves, bracts, bracteole, and the flowering stalk. Leaves are simple, rosulate in arrangement with entire margins.

The corm plants generally bloom with purple flowers in the autumn. These flowers are sterile, each have six petals and three red or orange stigmas.

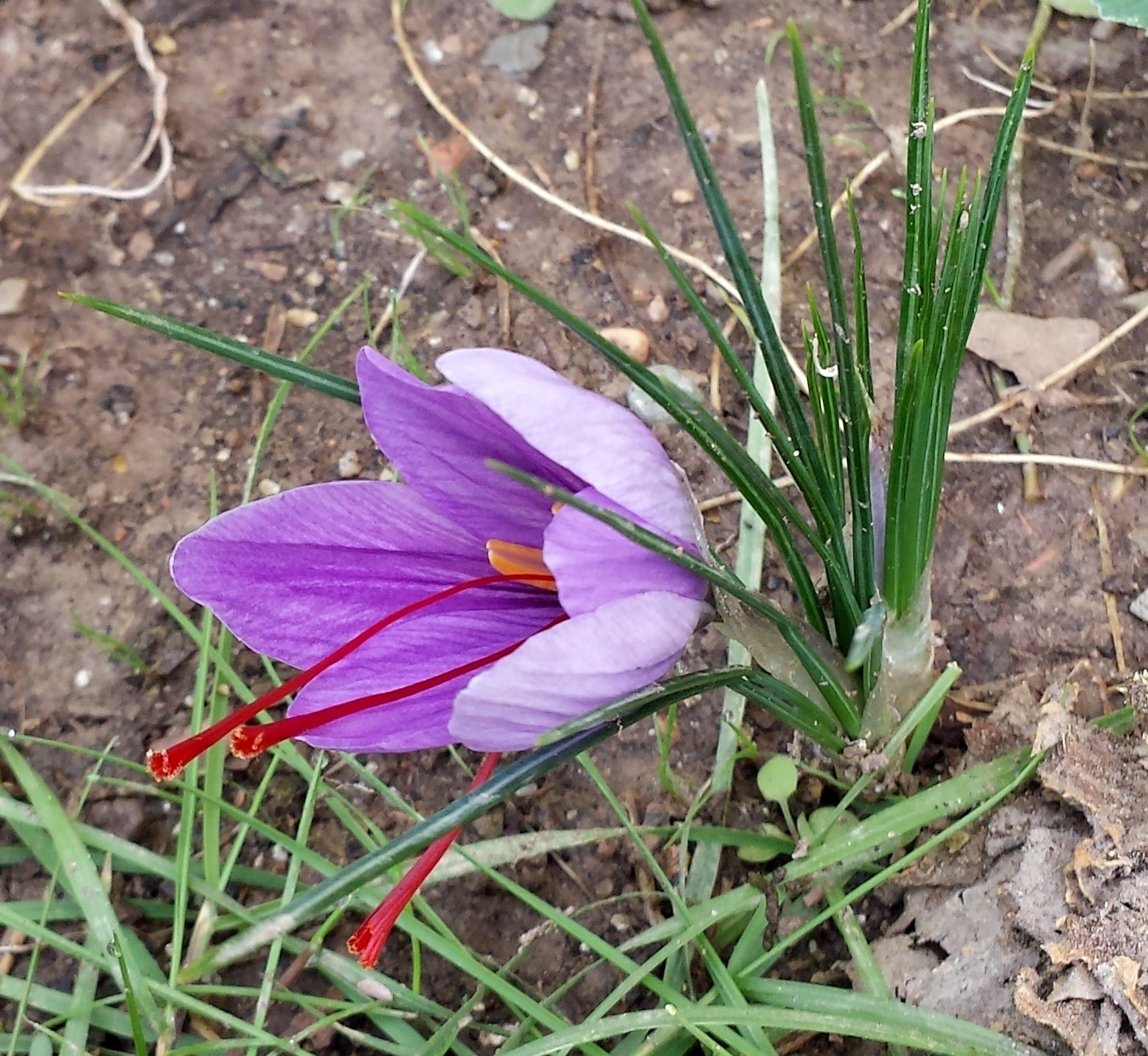
Flower's profile, Serra de Casteltallat, Catalonia, Spain

Macro photograph of saffron flower (Crocus sativus)

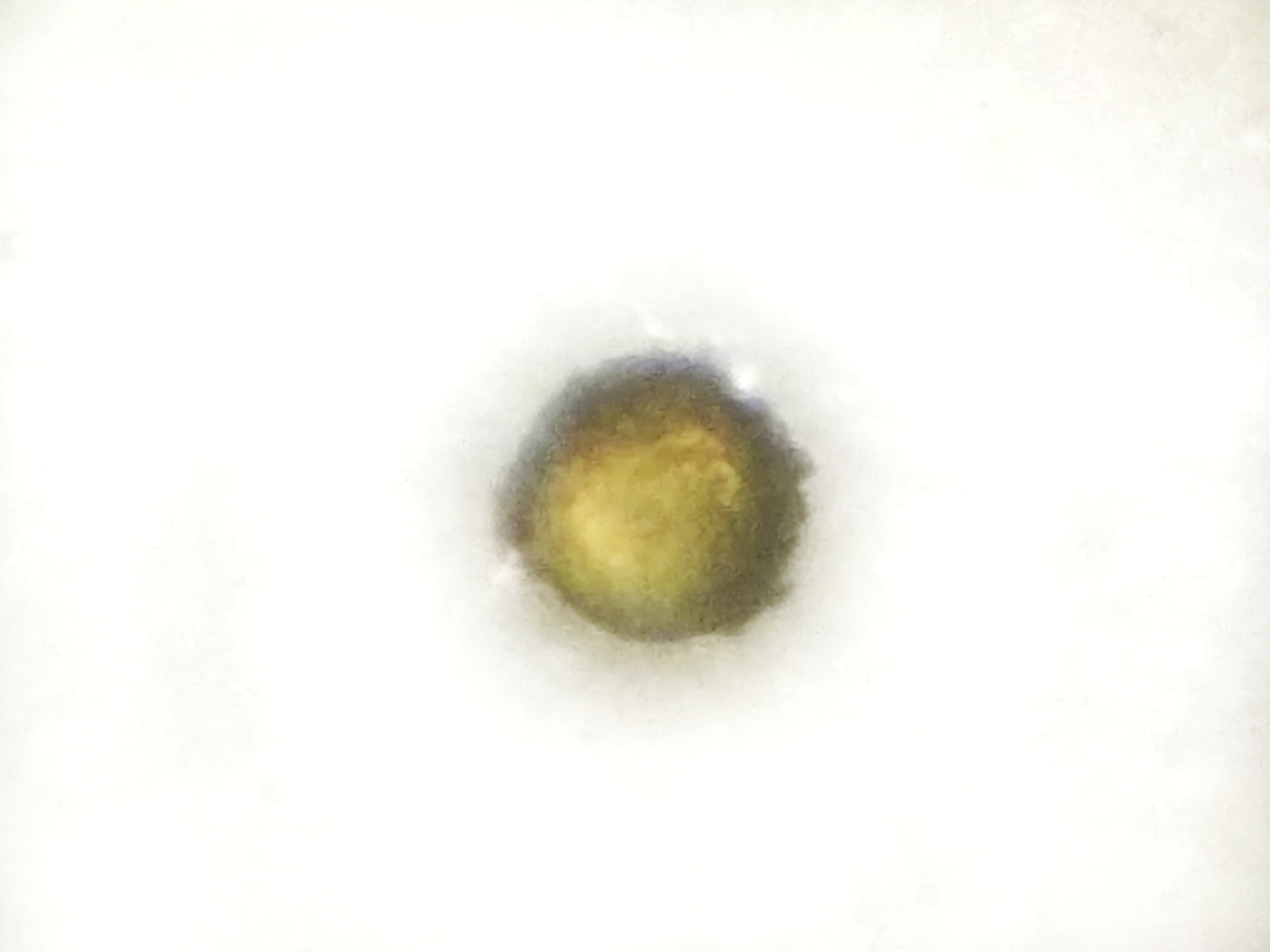
Pollen, Afghanistan

== Genetics ==
Saffron crocus is a triploid with 24 chromosomes (2n = 3x = 24), making the plant sexually sterile due to its inability to pair chromosomes during meiosis. Its most probable ancestor is the wild species Crocus cartwrightianus. Although C. thomasii and C. pallasii were still being considered as potential predecessors or genetic contributors, these hypotheses have not been successfully verified by chromosome and genome comparisons.

== Domestication ==
It is thought that the domesticated saffron crocus most likely arose as a result of selective breeding from the wild C. cartwrightianus in the southern portion of mainland Greece. An origin in Western or Central Asia, although often suspected, is not supported by botanical research.

== Uses ==
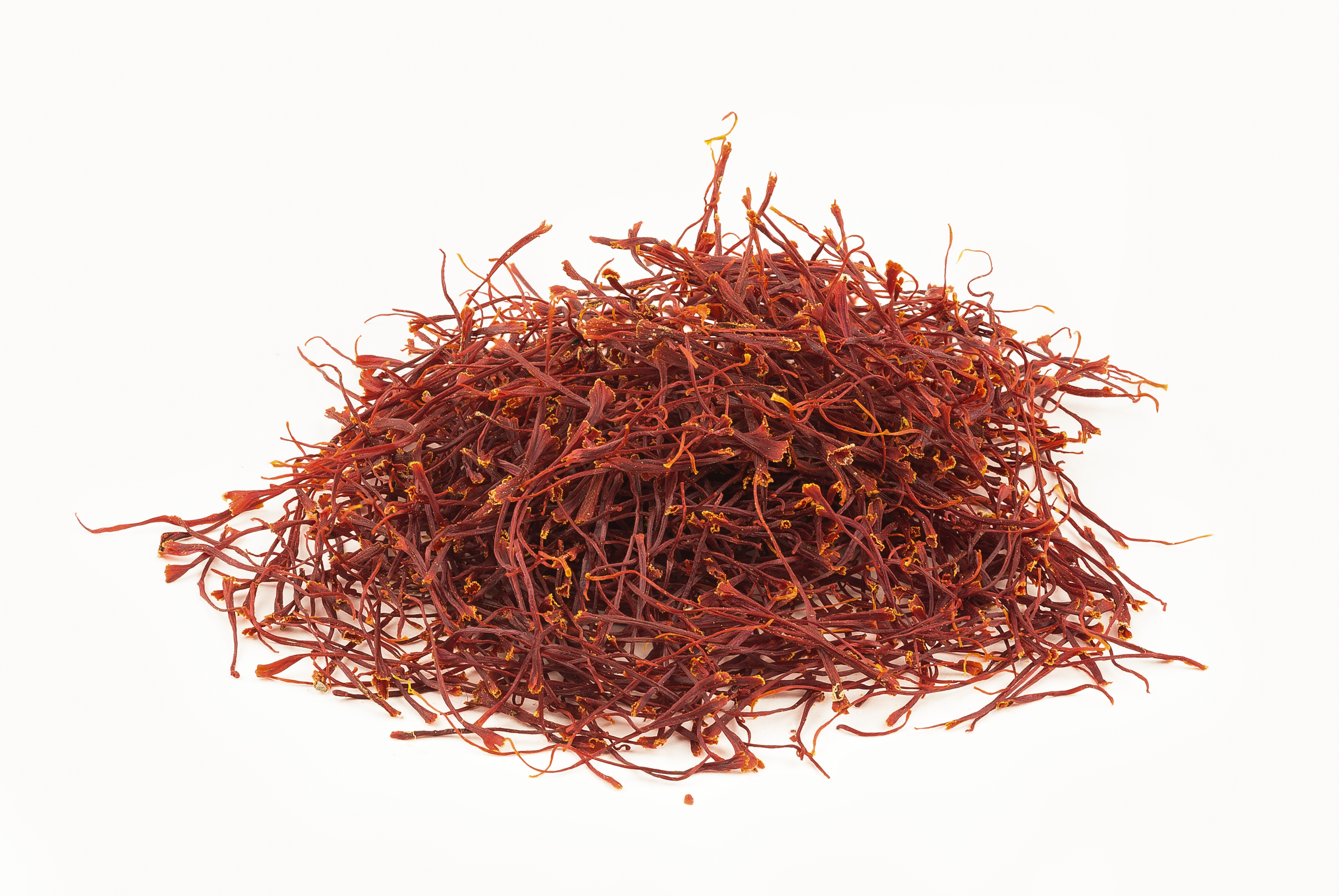
Saffron threads are the dried styles and stigmas of C. sativus.

The stigmas of the flower are used as the culinary spice saffron. It is also used for health purposes, especially in traditional Asian medicine - owing to biologically active chemical compounds (mainly alkaloids, anthocyanins, carotenoids, flavonoid, phenolic, saponins, and terpenoids) saffron causes among others mood-enhancing effect (including persons with major depressive disorder). Depending on the size of harvested stigmas, the flowers of between 50,000 and 75,000 individual plants are required to produce about 1 pound of saffron; each corm produces only one or two flowers, and each flower produces only three stigmas. Stigmas should be harvested mid-morning when the flowers are fully opened. Saffron crocus can be used as an ornamental.

== Cultivation ==
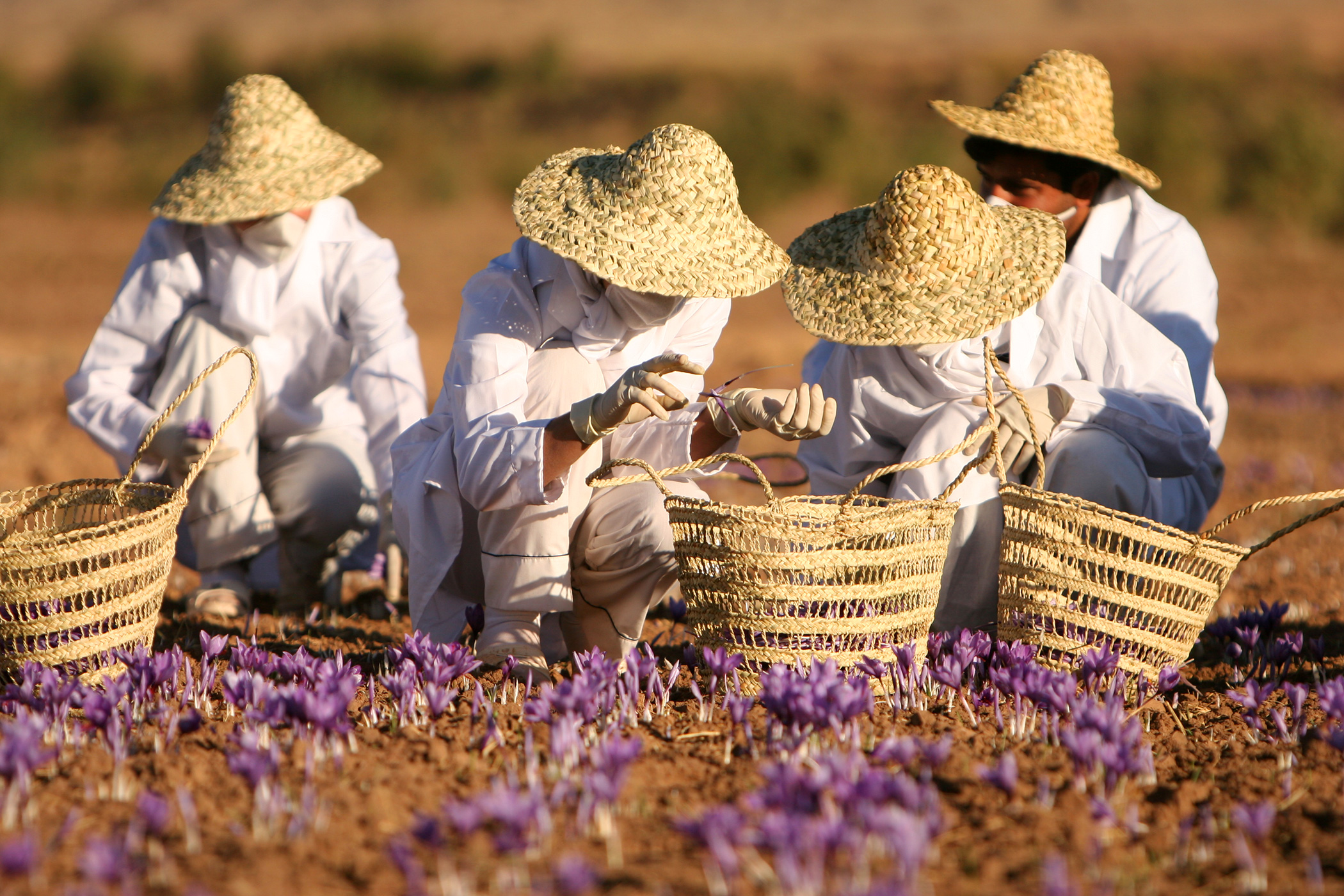
Saffron harvesting, Torbat-e Heydarieh, Iran.

As a sterile triploid, C. sativus is unknown in the wild and relies upon manual vegetative multiplication for its continued propagation. Because all cultured individuals of this plant are clonal, there is minimal genetic diversity from the single domestication event, making it quite hard to find cultivars with new, potentially beneficial properties, let alone combine them by breeding. Cultivars of saffron are nevertheless produced by a number of means:

- Clonal selection. Any plant with a desirable mutation is kept and further grown. This is the traditional approach.
- Mutation breeding. Mutagenesis can be used to cause a wide range of mutations to select from. The traditional clonal process follows.
- Sexual reproduction. Breeding for desirable features is much easier in fertile plants.
  - Although the plant is not self-fertile, some wild relatives can be successfully cross-pollinated with saffron pollen in vitro and form seeds. This creates fertile diploid plants containing genomic material from C. sativus, allowing new traits to be explored via further cross-pollination.
  - Chromosome doubling could in principle also create a fertile hexaploid plant. Such a change may be possible via colchicine.

Corms of saffron crocus should be planted 10 cm (4 in) apart and in a trough 10 cm (4 in) deep. The flower grows best in areas of full sun in well-drained soil with moderate levels of organic content. The corms will multiply after each year, and each corm will last 3–5 years.

== Gallery ==
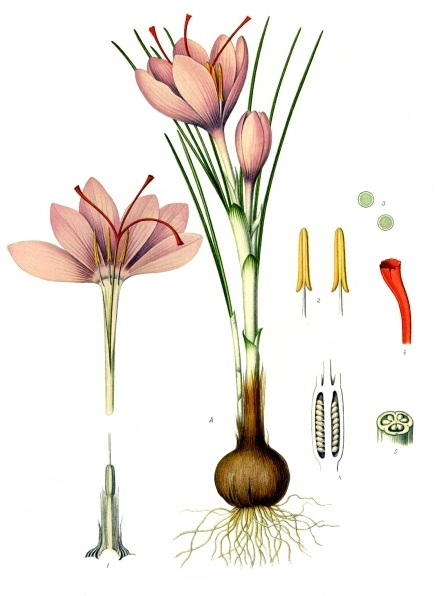
Illustration from Köhler's Medizinal-Pflanzen (1897)

== See also ==
Topics related to saffron:

- History of saffron
- Trade and use of saffron
