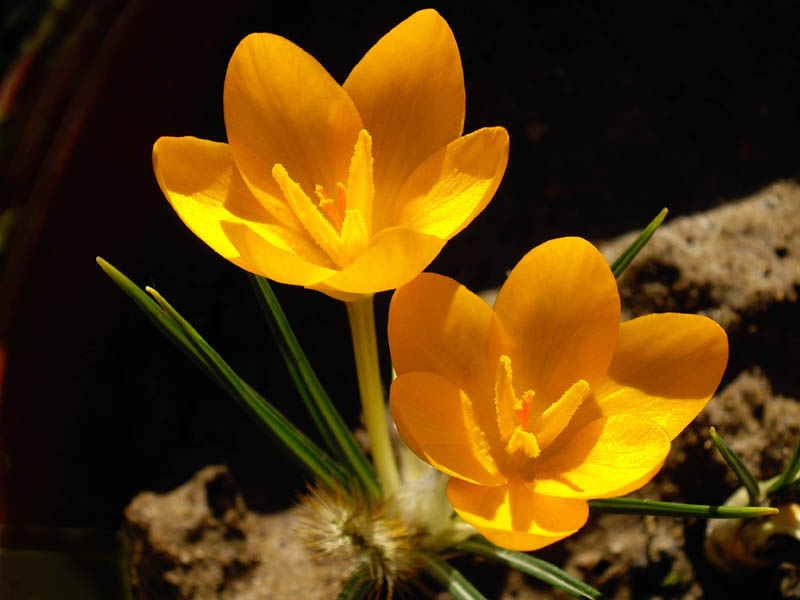

Scientific classification
- Kingdom: Plantae
- Clade: Tracheophytes
- Clade: Angiosperms
- Clade: Monocots
- Order: Asparagales
- Family: Iridaceae
- Genus: Crocus
- Species: C. ancyrensis

Binomial name
- Crocus ancyrensis (Herb.) Maw

Synonyms
- Crocus reticulatus var. ancyrensis Herb.

= Crocus ancyrensis =

Species of flowering plant

Crocus ancyrensis, sometimes known as the Ankara crocus, (Turkish: Ankara çiğdemi) is a species of flowering plant in the family Iridaceae. It is endemic to North and Central Turkey. It was named ancyrensis as it was first discovered in Ankara.

== Description ==
Crocus ancyrensis is a herbaceous perennial geophyte growing from a corm. Plants grow 4 to 6 inches tall. The corms are oval shaped with fibrous reticulated tunics. The small flowers are 1 inch long and 0.5 ince wide are orange-yellow with orange-red stigmas. The flowers have bright yellow throats and typically each corm produce two or three flowers. Each corm has three or four leaves which appear during flowering.

== Habitat ==
The plant commonly flowers in the months of February to April, and is found growing at 1000–1600 meters in elevation. It commonly grows near rocks, bushes and pines. Its corm, rich in sugar and starch, is edible; it has been a common staple in Anatolia.

== Cultivation ==
Crocus ancyrensis 'Golden Bunch' is a cultivar that was selected for its greater number of flowers than the typical species, with up to ten flowers per corm. It is one of the earliest yellows to bloom. It is winter hardy in USDA zones 3 through 8.

== Gallery ==
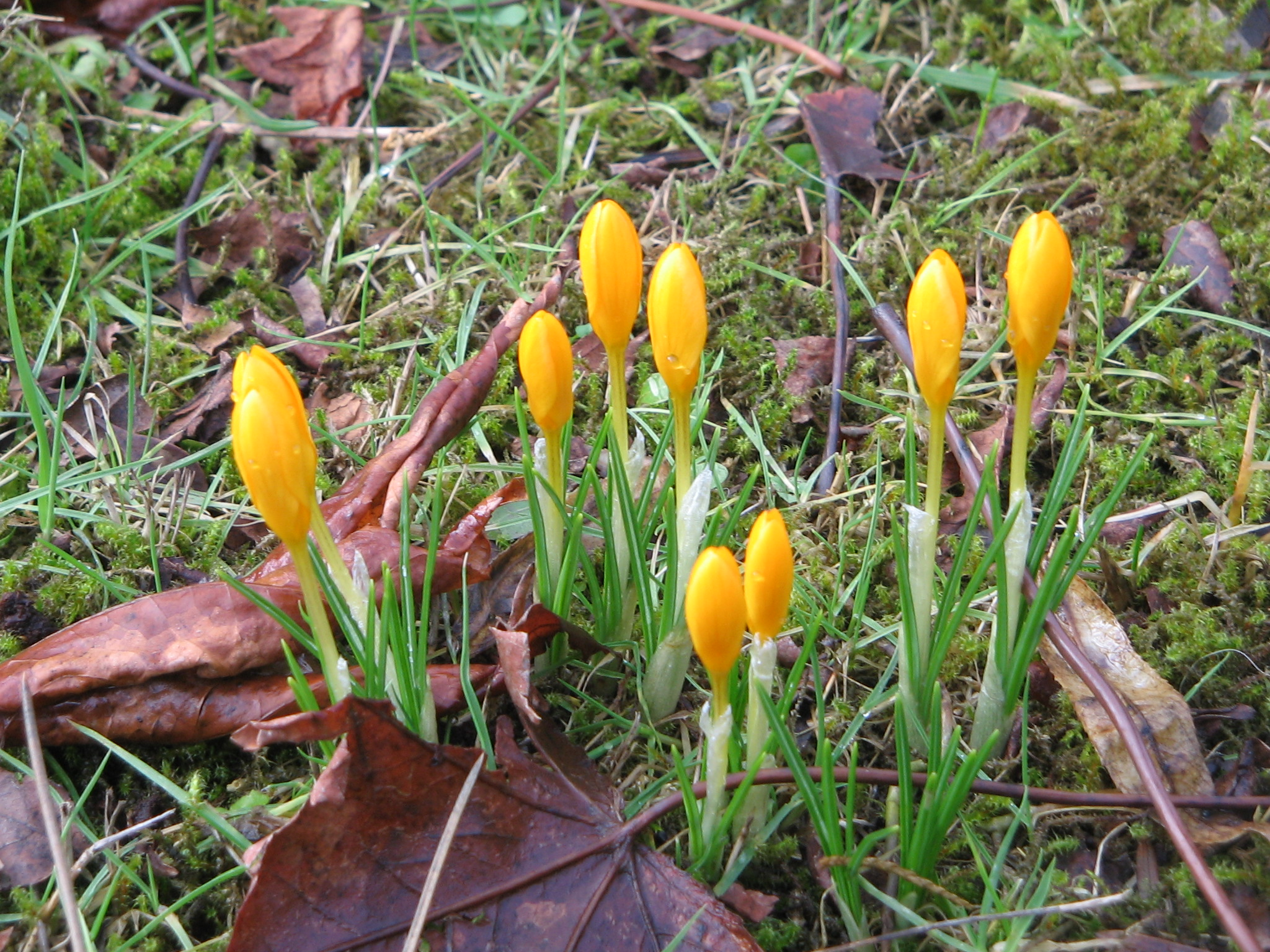

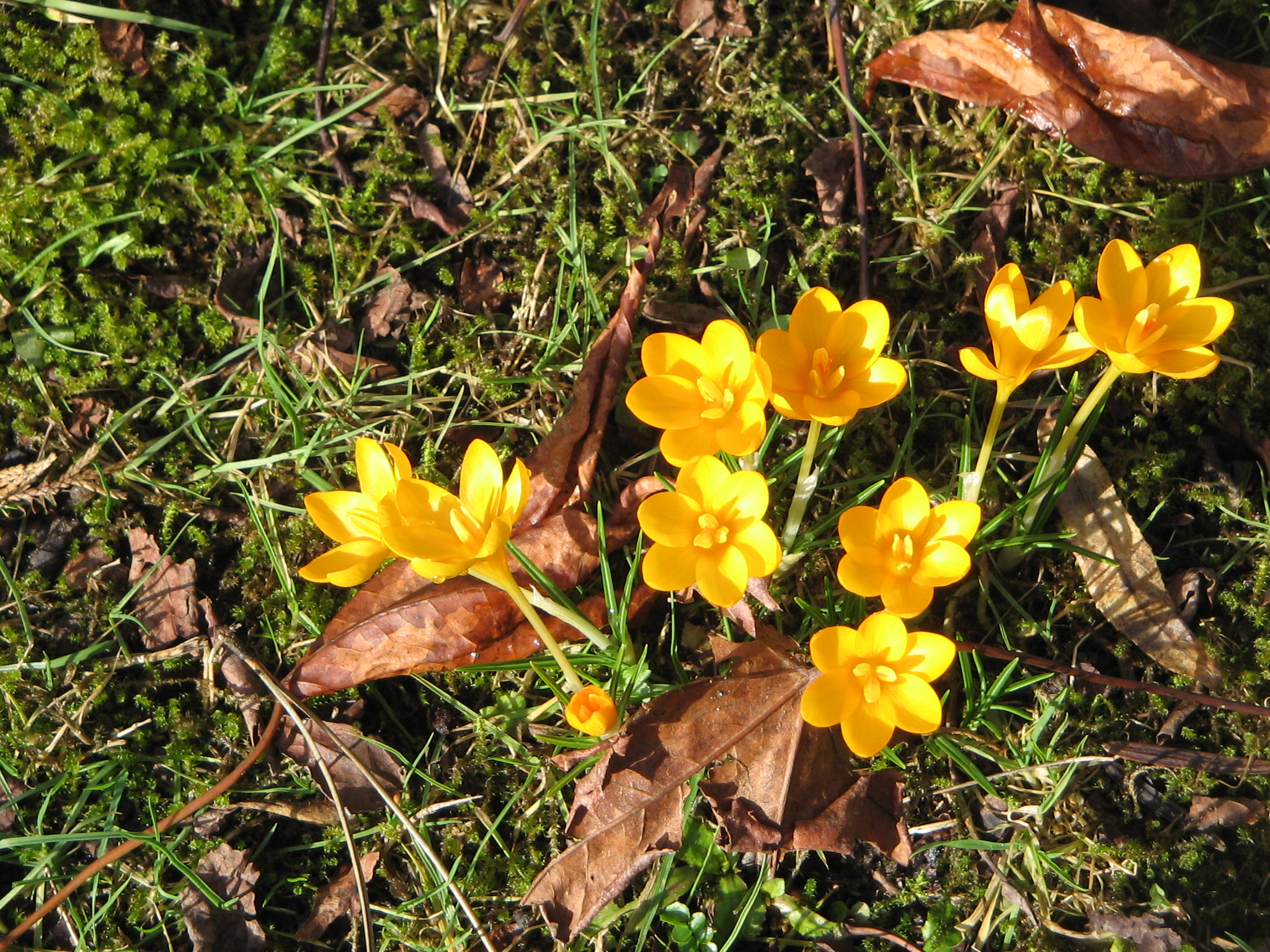

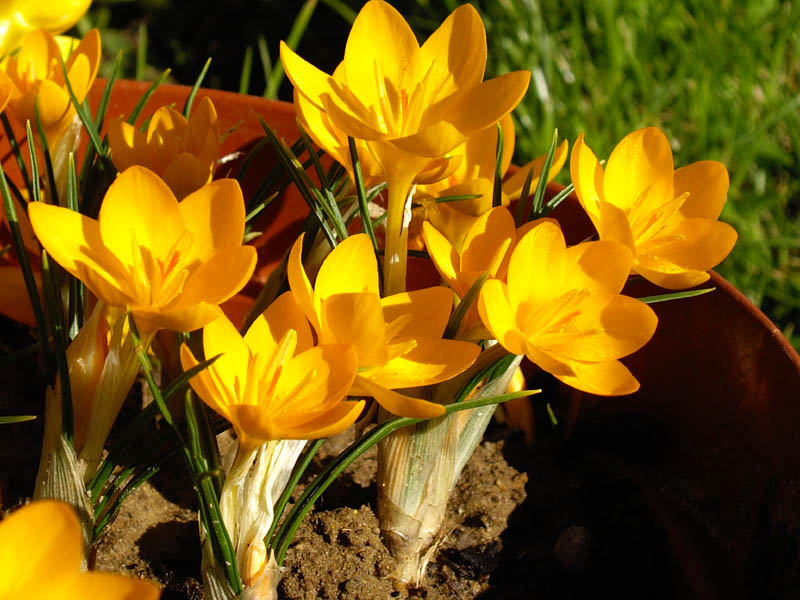
