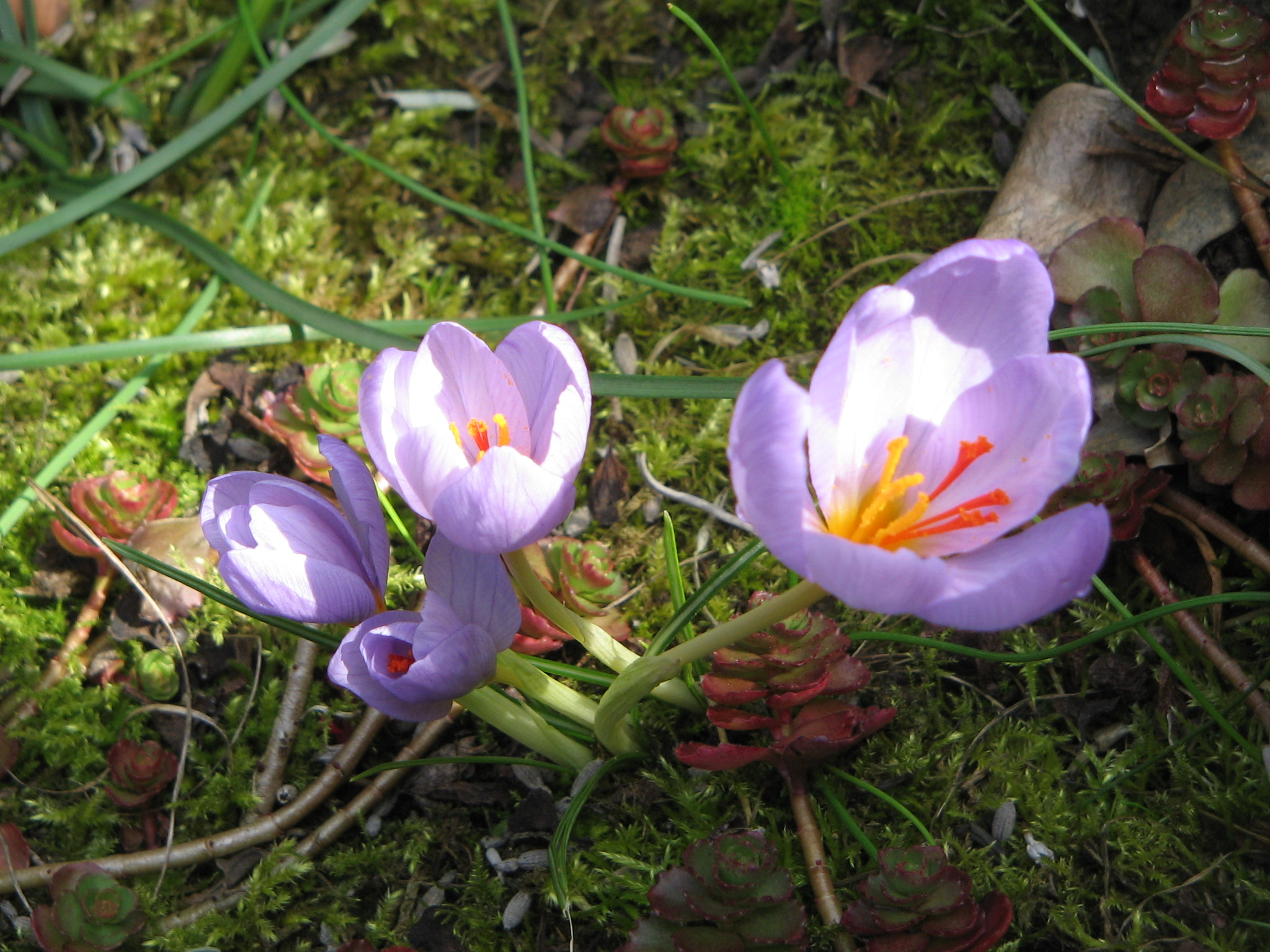

Scientific classification
- Kingdom: Plantae
- Clade: Tracheophytes
- Clade: Angiosperms
- Clade: Monocots
- Order: Asparagales
- Family: Iridaceae
- Genus: Crocus
- Species: C. longiflorus

Binomial name
- Crocus longiflorus Raf.

= Crocus longiflorus =

Species of flowering plant

Crocus longiflorus, the long-flowered crocus, is a species of flowering plant in the genus Crocus of the family Iridaceae, found in Southwest Italy, Sicilia, and Malta.

Growing to 10 cm (3.9 in) tall, it is a cormous perennial. It produces pale lilac or purple blooms in autumn, along with the sword-shaped leaves.

In the 19th century, Crocus longiflorus stigmas were harvested from the wild and used for saffron in Sicily.

In cultivation in the UK, this plant is a recipient of the Royal Horticultural Society's Award of Garden Merit.
