= HPS stain =

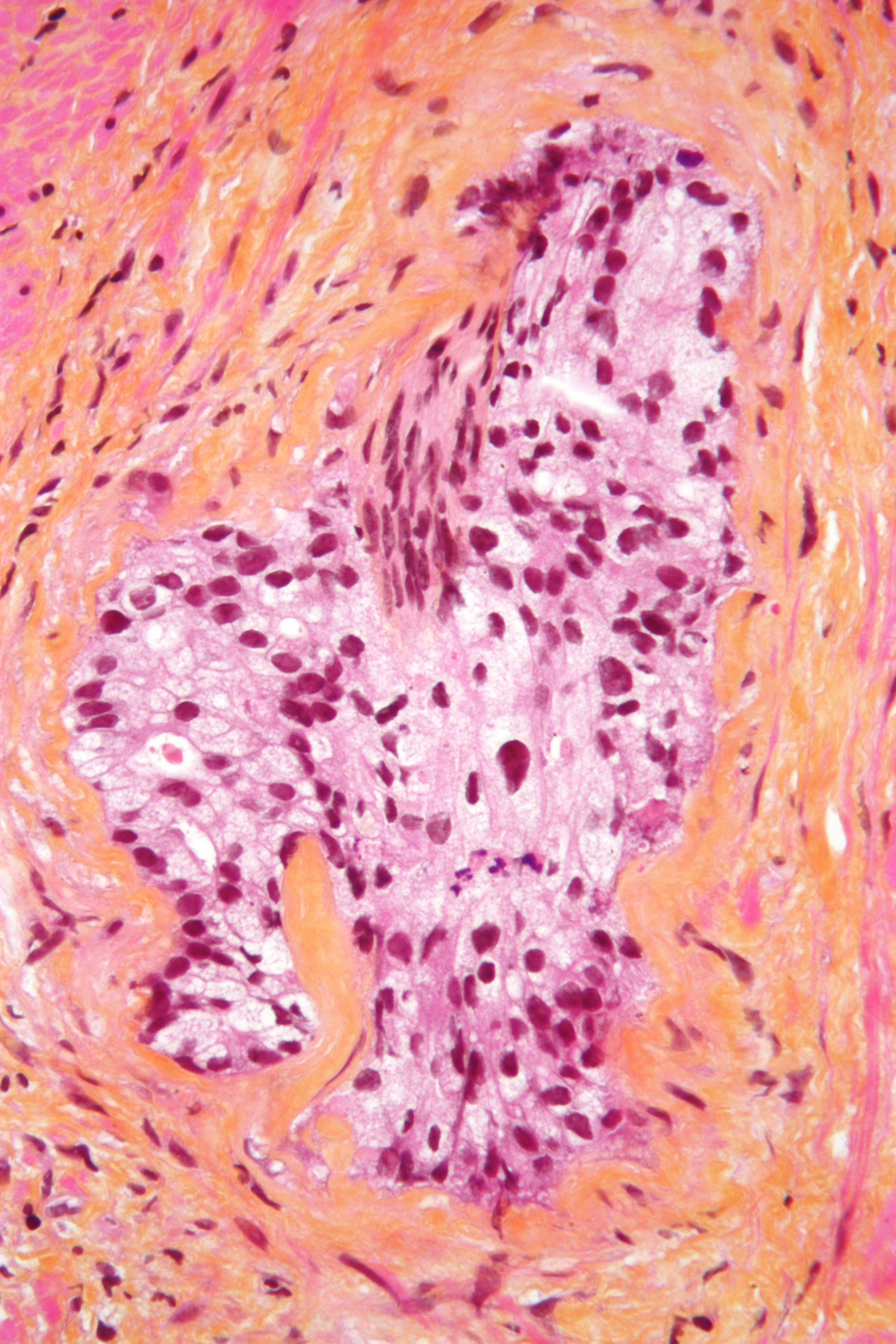
Micrograph of a HPS stained section demonstrating perineural spread of prostate adenocarcinoma.

In histology, the HPS stain, or hematoxylin phloxine saffron stain, is a way of marking tissues.

HPS is similar to H&E, the standard bearer in histology. However, it differentiates between the most common connective tissue (collagen) and muscle and cytoplasm by staining the former yellow and the latter two pink, unlike an H&E stain, which stains all three pink.

HPS stained sections are more expensive than H&E stained sections, primarily due to the cost of saffron.

== See also ==
- Histopathology
