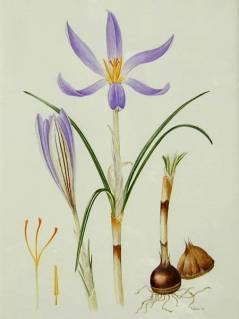

Scientific classification
- Kingdom: Plantae
- Clade: Tracheophytes
- Clade: Angiosperms
- Clade: Monocots
- Order: Asparagales
- Family: Iridaceae
- Genus: Crocus
- Species: C. haussknechtii

Binomial name
- Crocus haussknechtii (Boiss. & Reut. ex Maw) Boiss.

Synonyms
- Crocus pallasii subsp. haussknechtii(Boiss. & Reut. ex Maw) B.Mathew

= Crocus haussknechtii =

Species of flowering plant

Crocus haussknechtii is species of flowering plant growing from a corm native to southern Jordan, northern Iraq to western Iran.

== Description ==
Crocus haussknechtii is a herbaceous perennial geophyte growing from a corm. The corm is surrounded by a tunic with silky, 7–9 cm long fibers, that rise above the corm. The stigmatic branches are about half of the length of the perianth segments. The throat of the perianth is bearded. The leaves appear after flowering.
