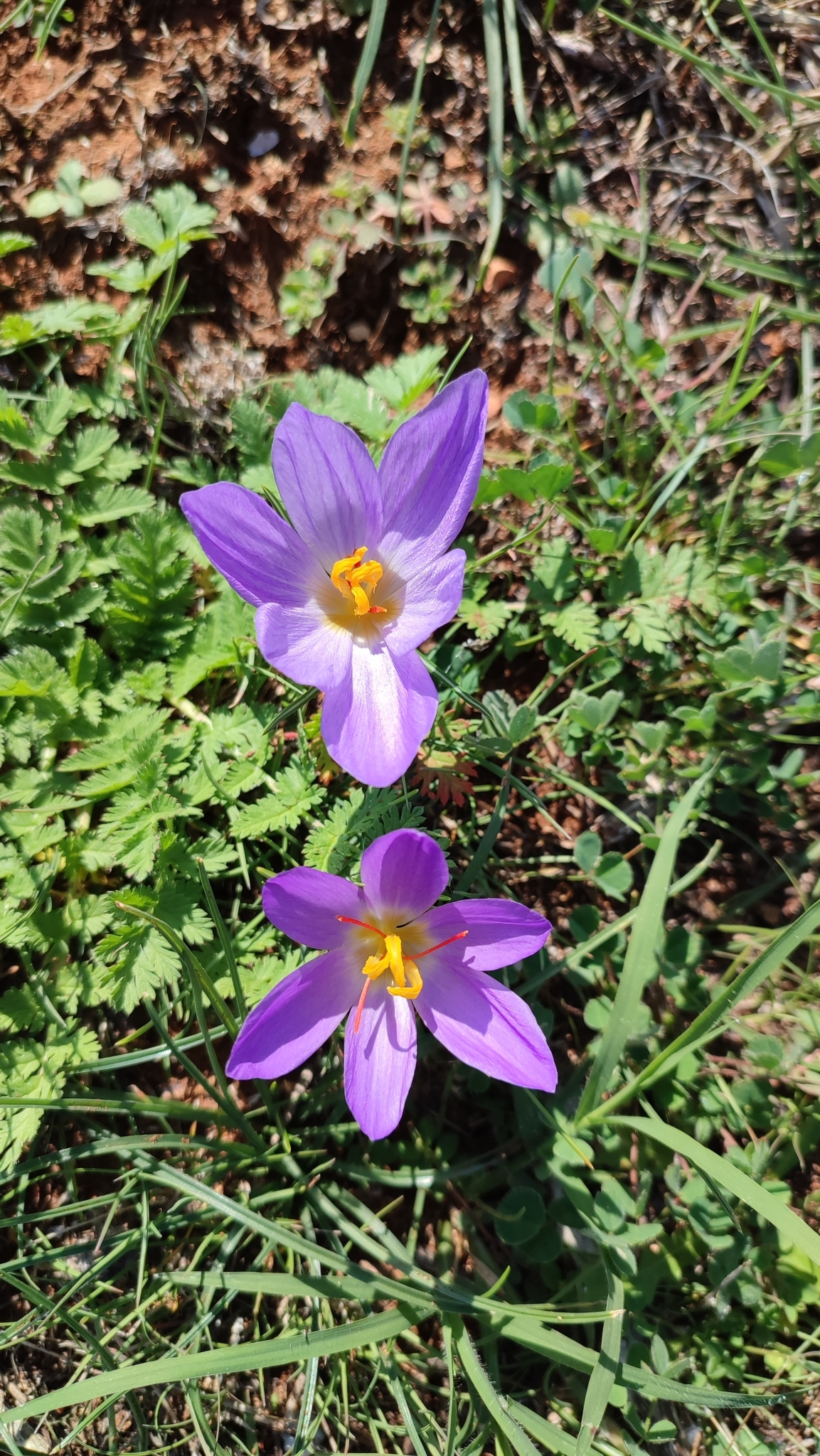

Scientific classification
- Kingdom: Plantae
- Clade: Tracheophytes
- Clade: Angiosperms
- Clade: Monocots
- Order: Asparagales
- Family: Iridaceae
- Genus: Crocus
- Species: C. thomasii

Binomial name
- Crocus thomasii Ten.

Synonyms
- Crocus thomasianus Herb.; Crocus visianicus Herb.

= Crocus thomasii =

Species of flowering plant

Crocus thomasii is a species of flowering plant in the genus Crocus of the family Iridaceae. It is a cormous perennial native from southern Italy to Croatia.

In the 19th century around Taranto, South Italy, Crocus thomasii stigmas were harvested from the wild and used to flavour dishes as a kind of wild saffron. It is a possible ancestor of the domesticated saffron crocus, Crocus sativus.

== Sources ==
- Grilli Caiola, M. (2003), "Saffron Reproductive Biology", Acta Horticulturae, 650 (650), ISHS: 25–37, doi:10.17660/ActaHortic.2004.650.1, S2CID 89990377
- Negbi, M., ed. (1999), Saffron: Crocus sativus L., CRC Press, ISBN 978-90-5702-394-1
