= Phloxine =

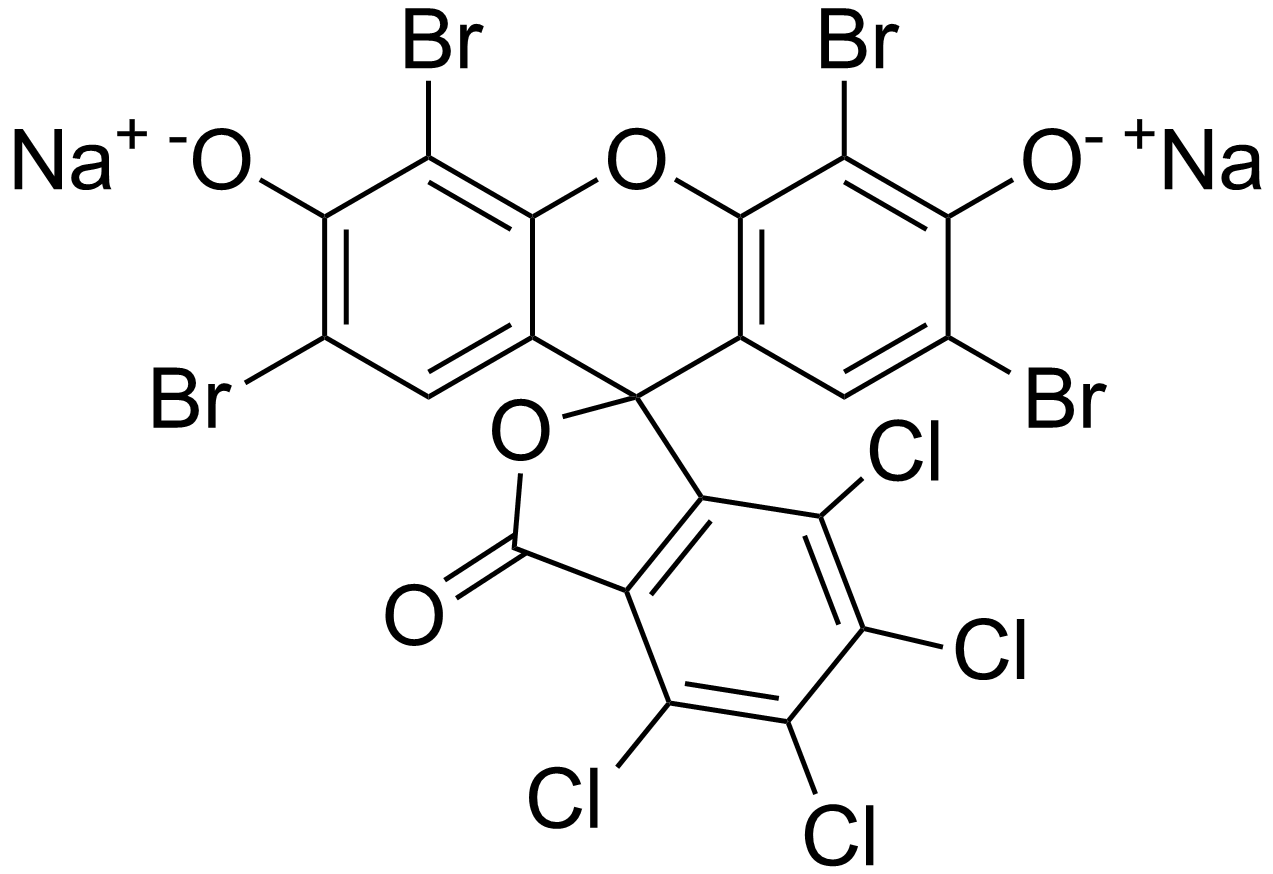

Names
- Preferred IUPAC name Disodium 2′,4′,5′,7′-tetrabromo-4,5,6,7-tetrachloro-3-oxo-3H-spiro[[2]benzofuran-1,9′-xanthene]-3′,6′-bis(olate)
- Other names Cyanosin; Cyanosine; Eosine bluish; Eosine Blue; Cyanosin B; Eosin Blue; Phloxine P; Phloxin B; Eosine I Bluish; Acid red 92; C.I. 45410; D & C Red no. 28

Identifiers
CAS Number	18472-87-2
3D model (JSmol)	Interactive image
ChEBI	CHEBI:87192
ChemSpider	4938793
DrugBank	DB13911
ECHA InfoCard	100.038.490
EC Number	242-355-6
PubChem CID	6433718
UNII	767IP0Y5NH
CompTox Dashboard (EPA)	DTXSID1031090
- InChI: InChI=1S/C20H4Br4Cl4O5.2Na/c21-5-1-3-17(9(23)15(5)29)32-18-4(2-6(22)16(30)10(18)24)20(3)8-7(19(31)33-20)11(25)13(27)14(28)12(8)26;;/h1-2,29-30H;;/q;2*+1/p-2 Key: OOYIOIOOWUGAHD-UHFFFAOYSA-L
- SMILES: C1=C2C(=C(C(=C1Br)[O-])Br)OC3=C(C(=C(C=C3C24C5=C(C(=C(C(=C5Cl)Cl)Cl)Cl)C(=O)O4)Br)[O-])Br.[Na+].[Na+]

Properties
Chemical formula	C_{20}H_{2}Br_{4}Cl_{4}Na_{2}O_{5}
Molar mass	829.63 g·mol^{−1}
Appearance	Red to brown powder
Solubility in water	Soluble
- Except where otherwise noted, data are given for materials in their standard state (at 25 °C [77 °F], 100 kPa). verify (what is ?) Infobox references

Phloxine B (commonly known simply as phloxine) is a water-soluble red dye used for coloring drugs and cosmetics in the United States and coloring food in Japan. It is derived from fluorescein, but differs by the presence of four bromine atoms at positions 2, 4, 5 and 7 of the xanthene ring and four chlorine atoms in the carboxyphenyl ring. It has an absorption maximum around 540 nm and an emission maximum around 564 nm. Apart from industrial use, phloxine B has functions as an antimicrobial substance, viability dye and biological stain. For example, it is used in hematoxylin-phloxine-saffron (HPS) staining to color the cytoplasm and connective tissue in shades of red.

== Antimicrobial properties ==
=== Lethal dosage levels ===
In the presence of light, phloxine B has a bactericidal effect on gram-positive strains, such as Bacillus subtilis, Bacillus cereus, and several methicillin-resistant Staphylococcus aureus (MRSA) strains. At a minimum inhibitory concentration of 25 μM, growth is reduced by 10-fold within 2.5 hours. At concentrations of 50 μM and 100 μM, growth is stopped completely and cell counts decrease by a factor of 10^{4} to 10^{5}. For humans, the Food and Drug Administration deems phloxine B to be safe up to a daily dosage of 1.25 mg/kg.

=== Mechanism of action ===
Bacteria exposed to phloxine B die from oxidative damage. Phloxine B ionizes in water to become a negatively charged ion that binds to positively charged cellular components. When phloxine B is subjected to light, debromination occurs and free radicals and singlet oxygen are formed. These compounds cause irreversible damage to the bacteria, leading to growth arrest and cell death. Gram-negative bacteria are phloxine B-resistant due to the outer cell membrane that surrounds them. This polysaccharide-coated lipid bilayer creates a permeability barrier that prevents efficient uptake of the compound. Addition of EDTA, which is known to strip the lipopolysaccharides and increase membrane permeability, removes the phloxine B resistance and allows gram-negative bacteria to be killed as well.

== Measure of viability ==
Phloxine B can be used to stain dead cells of several yeasts, including Saccharomyces cerevisiae and Schizosaccharomyces pombe. When diluted in yeast growth media, the dye is unable to entere cell because of their membranes. Dead yeast cells lose membrane integrity, so phloxine B can enter and stain the intracellular cytosolic compounds. Therefore, staining is a measure of cell death. In cell counting assays, the number of fluorescent (i.e. dead) cells observed through a haemocytometer can be compared to the total number of cells to give a measure of mortality. The same principle can be applied at higher throughput by fluorescence-activated flow cytometry (FACS), where all phloxine B-stained cells in a sample are counted. [Note: some reports suggest that phloxine B is instead pumped out of live yeast cells but retained in dead/dying yeast cells. However, definitive evidence for either model is still needed.]
