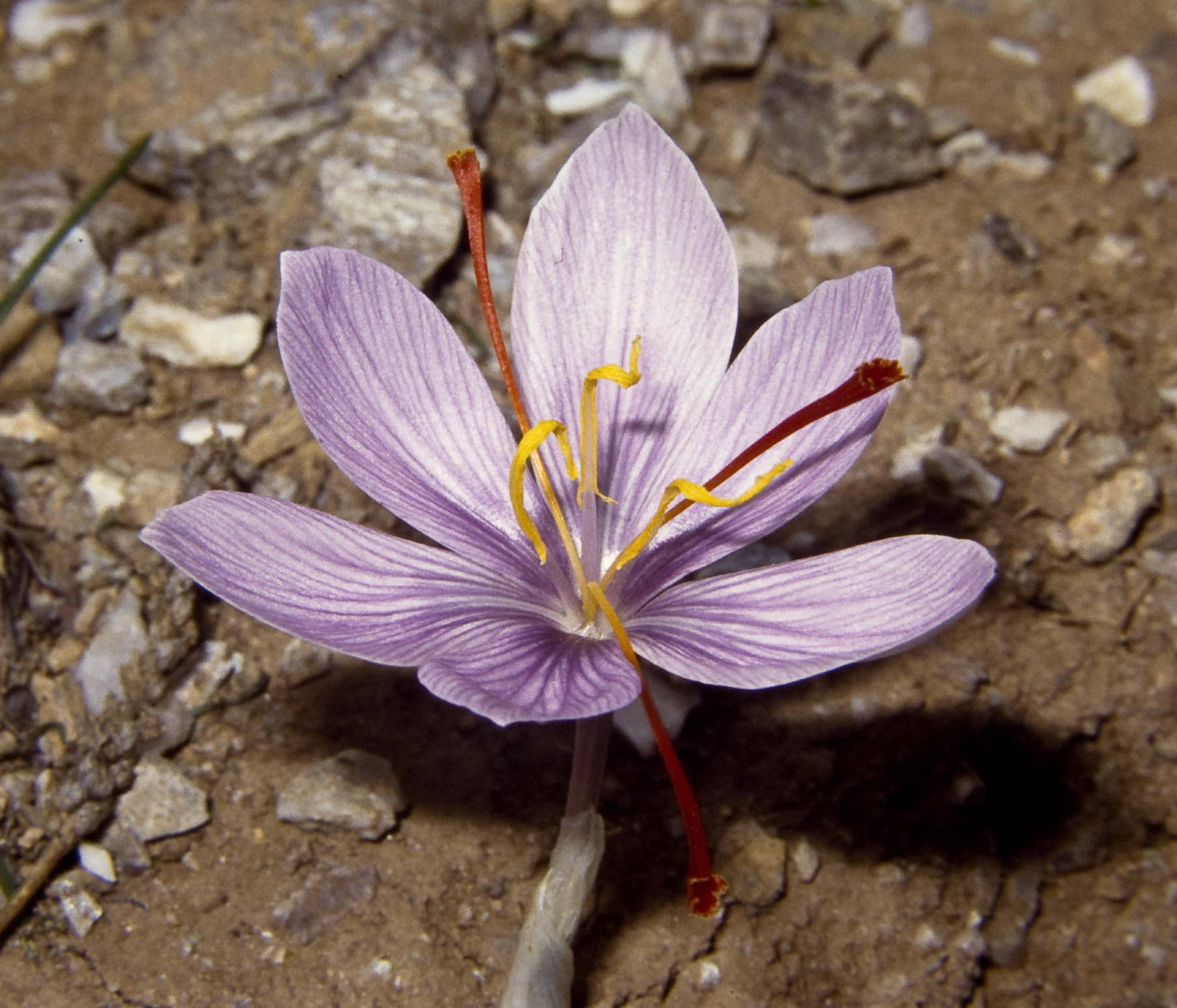

Conservation status
- Least Concern (IUCN 3.1)

Scientific classification
- Kingdom: Plantae
- Clade: Tracheophytes
- Clade: Angiosperms
- Clade: Monocots
- Order: Asparagales
- Family: Iridaceae
- Genus: Crocus
- Species: C. cartwrightianus

Binomial name
- Crocus cartwrightianus Herb.

Synonyms
- Crocus sativus var. cartwrightianus (Herb.) Maw; Crocus sativus subsp. cartwrightianus (Herb.) K.Richt.; Crocus cartwrightianus var. creticus Herb.; Crocus graecus Chapp.; Crocus pallasii Spruner ex Boiss.

= Crocus cartwrightianus =

Species of flowering plant

Crocus cartwrightianus is a species of flowering plant in the family Iridaceae. It is native to mainland Greece, Euboea, Crete, Skyros and some islands of the Cyclades. It is a cormous perennial growing to 5 cm (2 in). The flowers, in shades of lilac or white with purple veins and prominent red stigmas, appear with the leaves in autumn and winter.

== Description ==
The flower style divides while still within the throat of the flower, well below the bases of the anthers. The branches of the stigma are taller than the anthers and about the same length as the petals. The throat of the flower is bearded. The leaves and flowers are produced at the same.

The Latin specific epithet cartwrightianus refers to the 19th-century British consul to Constantinople, John Cartwright.

C. cartwrightianus is possibly a wild progenitor of the domesticated triploid Crocus sativus – the saffron crocus with a population in Attica, Greece suggested as the closest known modern population to the saffron ancestors. Saffron likely originated in Iran, Greece or Mesopotamia.

== Habitat ==
This species is commonly found growing on limestone soil areas of the Attica Peninsula of Greece.

== Cultivation ==
There is evidence that this plant was cultivated in ancient Crete at least as early as the Middle Minoan Period, as exhibited by a mural, the "Saffron Gatherer", illustrating the gathering of crocuses. In the 19th century, wild Crocus cartwrightianus was harvested on Andros in the islands of the Cyclades, for medicinal purposes and the stigmas for making a pigment called Zafran.

This plant has received the Royal Horticultural Society's Award of Garden Merit.

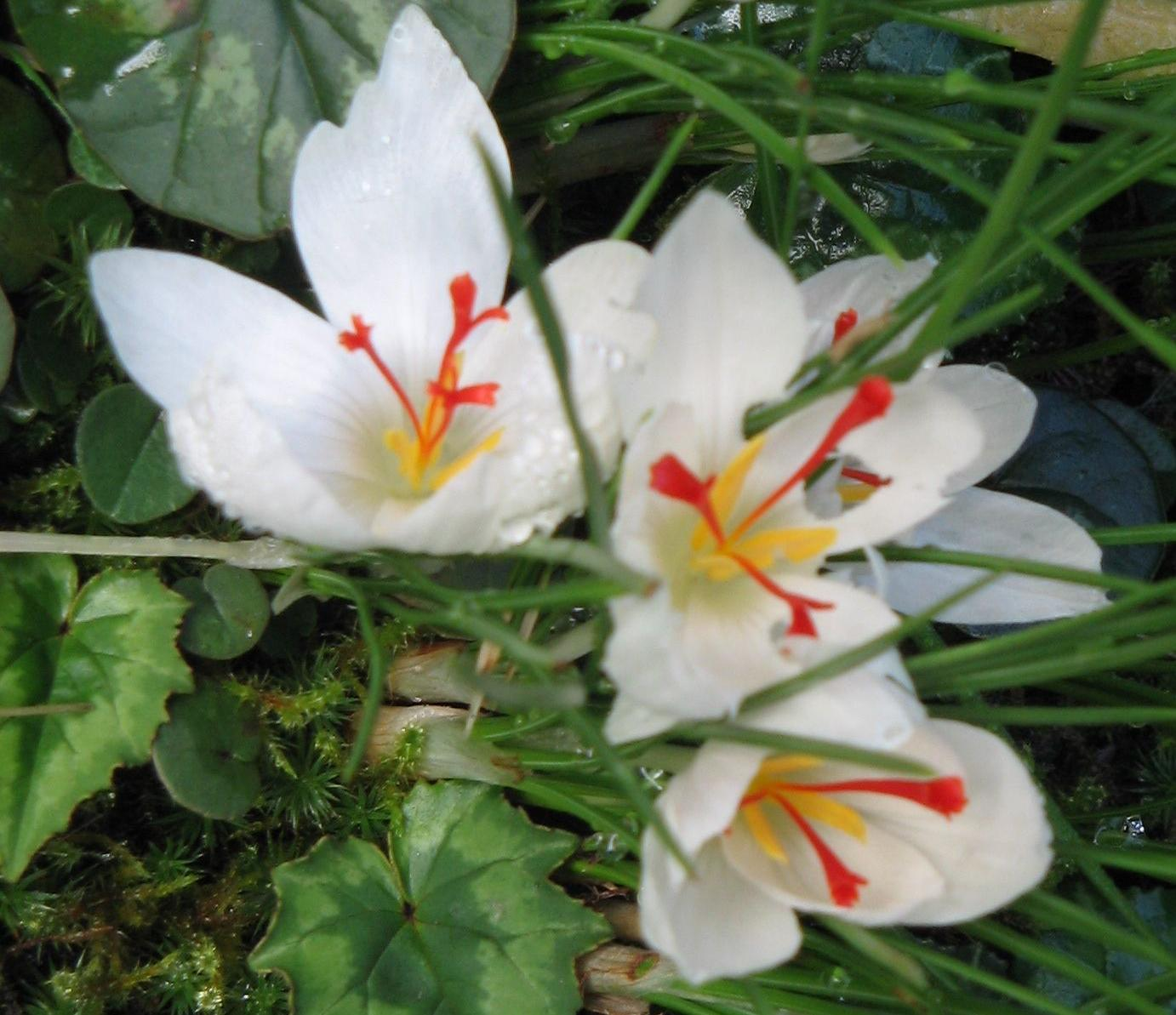
C. cartwrightianus 'Albus'
