= List of Desmodium species =

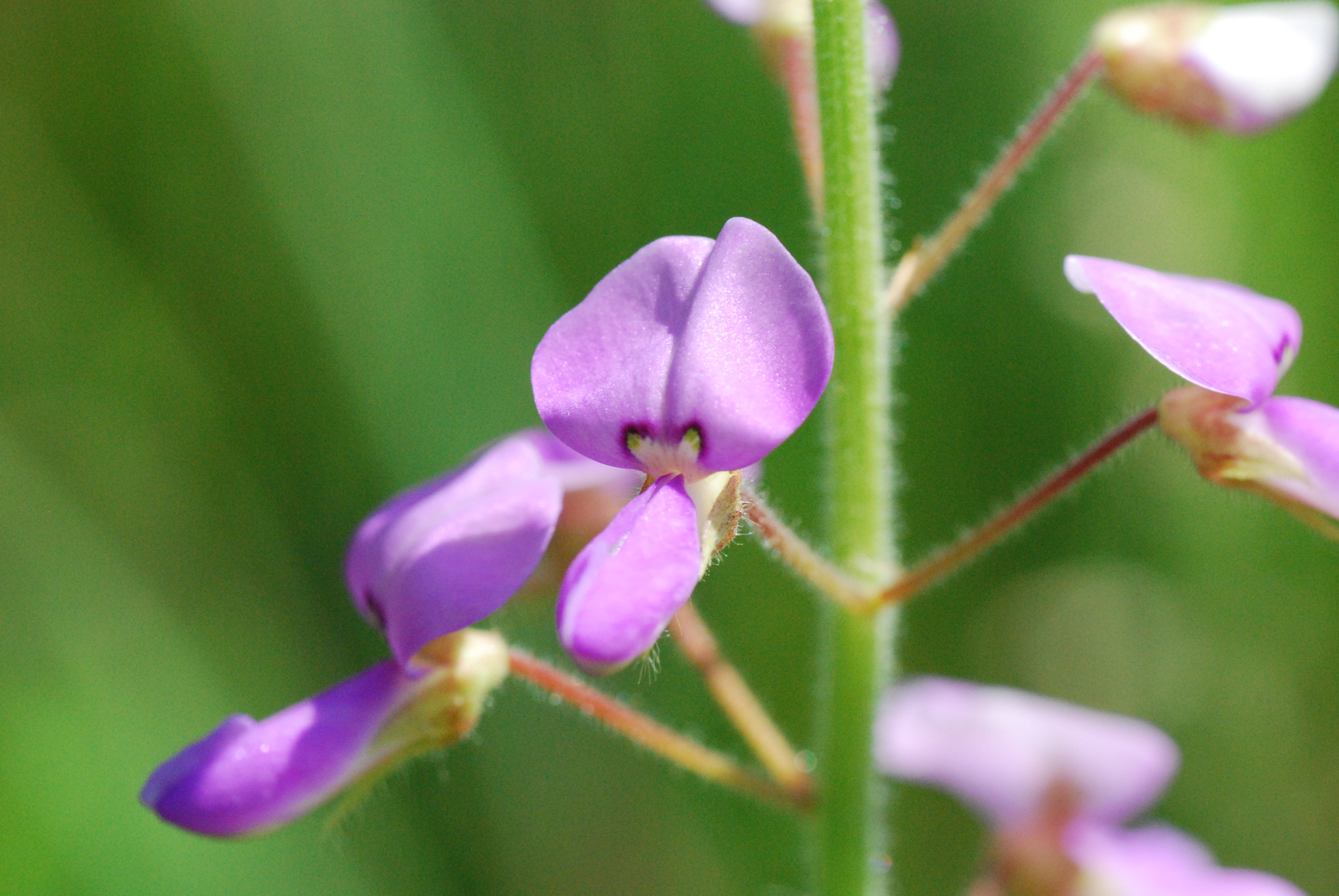
Desmodium illinoense

Desmodium is a large genus of plants in the pea family, Fabaceae (tribe Desmodieae). This is a list of species in the Genus Desmodium from Kew's Plants of the World Online database As of January 2020 and other sources:

- Desmodium acanthocladum F.Muell.
- Desmodium affine Schltdl.
- Desmodium alamanii DC.
- Desmodium album (Schindl.) J.F.Macbr.
- Desmodium ambiguum Hemsl.
- Desmodium amplifolium Hemsl.
- Desmodium angustatum (Rose & Standl.) Standl.
- Desmodium angustifolium (Kunth) DC.
- Desmodium arechavaletae Burkart
- Desmodium arizonicum S.Watson
- Desmodium axillare (Sw.) DC.
- Desmodium batocaulon A.Gray
- Desmodium bellum (S.F.Blake) B.G.Schub.
- Desmodium bioculatum S.Watson
- Desmodium bolsteri Merr. & Rolfe
- Desmodium bridgesii (Schindl.) Burkart
- Desmodium burkartii L.C.P.Lima & Vanni
- Desmodium cajanifolium (Kunth) DC.
- Desmodium callilepis Hemsl.
- Desmodium campyloclados Hemsl.
- Desmodium canadense (L.) DC.
- Desmodium canaliculatum B.G.Schub.
- Desmodium canescens (L.) DC.
- Desmodium caripense (Kunth) G.Don
- Desmodium chartaceum Brandegee
- Desmodium chiapense Brandegee
- Desmodium ciliare (Muhl. ex Willd.) DC.
- Desmodium cinerascens A.Gray
- Desmodium cinereum (Kunth) DC.
- Desmodium coloniense M.E.Jones
- Desmodium conzattii Greenm.
- Desmodium cordifolium (Harms) Schindl.
- Desmodium cordistipulum Hemsl.
- Desmodium craibii H.Ohashi
- Desmodium craspediferum A.M.G.Azevedo & F.Oliveira
- Desmodium crassum M.E.Jones
- Desmodium cubense Griseb.
- Desmodium cuneatum Hook. & Arn.
- Desmodium cuspidatum (Muhl. ex Willd.) DC. ex G.Don
- Desmodium delotum J.F.Macbr.
- Desmodium densiflorum Hemsl.
- Desmodium denudatum DC.
- Desmodium distortum (Aubl.) J.F.Macbr.
- Desmodium dregeanum Benth.
- Desmodium fernaldii B.G.Schub.
- Desmodium flexuosum Wall. ex Benth.
- Desmodium floridanum Chapm.
- Desmodium foliosum Hemsl.
- Desmodium gangeticum (L.) DC.
- Desmodium garhwalensis L.R.Dangwal & R.D.Gaur
- Desmodium ghiesbreghtii Hemsl.
- Desmodium glabellum (Michx.) DC.
- Desmodium glabrescens Malme
- Desmodium glabrum (Mill.) DC.
- Desmodium gracile M.Martens & Galeotti
- Desmodium grahamii A.Gray
- Desmodium guadalajaranum S.Watson
- Desmodium guaraniticum (Chodat & Hassl.) Malme
- Desmodium guianense DC.
- Desmodium gunnii Benth. ex Hook.f.
- Desmodium hartwegianum Hemsl.
- Desmodium hassleri (Schindl.) Burkart
- Desmodium helleri Peyr.
- Desmodium hickenianum Burkart
- Desmodium hirsutum M.Martens & Galeotti
- Desmodium hookerianum D.Dietr.
- Desmodium × humifusum (Muhl. ex Bigelow) L.C.Beck
- Desmodium illinoense A.Gray
- Desmodium incanum (Sw.) DC.
- Desmodium infractum DC.
- Desmodium intermedium Burkart
- Desmodium intortum (Mill.) Urb.
- Desmodium jaliscanum S.Watson
- Desmodium johnstonii Standl. ex B.G.Schub.
- Desmodium kaalense Guillaumin
- Desmodium laevigatum (Nutt.) DC.
- Desmodium lagopodioides Endl.
- Desmodium lamprocarpum Hemsl.
- Desmodium lavanduliflorum Standl.
- Desmodium leiocarpum (Spreng.) G.Don
- Desmodium lempirae C.Nelson
- Desmodium leptoclados Hemsl.
- Desmodium leptomeres (S.F.Blake) B.G.Schub. & McVaugh
- Desmodium limense Hook.
- Desmodium lindheimeri Vail
- Desmodium lineatum DC.
- Desmodium lobatum Schindl.
- Desmodium longiarticulatum (Rusby) Burkart
- Desmodium lupulinum Schltdl.
- Desmodium luteolum Standl.
- Desmodium macrodesmum (S.F.Blake) Standl. & Steyerm.
- Desmodium macropodium Hemsl.
- Desmodium macrostachyum Hemsl.
- Desmodium madrense Hemsl.
- Desmodium marilandicum (L.) DC.
- Desmodium maxonii (Standl.) Standl.
- Desmodium membranifolium L.C.P.Lima, A.M.G.Azevedo & L.P.Queiroz
- Desmodium metallicum (Rose & Standl.) Standl.
- Desmodium metcalfei (Rose & J.H.Painter) Kearney & Peebles
- Desmodium mexiae B.G.Schub.
- Desmodium michelianum (Schindl.) B.G.Schub. & McVaugh
- Desmodium michoacanum B.G.Schub. & McVaugh
- Desmodium micranthum (Schindl.) J.F.Macbr.
- Desmodium microcarpum (Rusby) L.C.P.Lima, A.M.G.Azevedo & L.P.Queiroz
- Desmodium miniatura Standl. & L.O.Williams
- Desmodium molliculum (Kunth) DC.
- Desmodium monticola Brandegee
- Desmodium nicaraguense Oerst.
- Desmodium nitidum M.Martens & Galeotti
- Desmodium novogalicianum B.G.Schub. & McVaugh
- Desmodium nuttallii (Schindl.) B.G.Schub.
- Desmodium obtusum (Muhl. ex Willd.) DC.
- Desmodium occidentale (C.V.Morton) Standl.
- Desmodium ochroleucum M.A.Curtis ex Canby
- Desmodium orbiculare Schltdl.
- Desmodium orizabanum Hemsl.
- Desmodium ospriostreblum Chiov.
- Desmodium pachyrhizum Vogel
- Desmodium painteri (Rose & Standl.) Standl.
- Desmodium pallidum (Rose & J.H.Painter) Standl.
- Desmodium palmeri Hemsl.
- Desmodium paniculatum (L.) DC.
- Desmodium paraguanae Pittier
- Desmodium parkinsonii Hemsl.
- Desmodium perplexum B.G.Schub.
- Desmodium platycarpum Benth.
- Desmodium plectocarpum Hemsl.
- Desmodium plicatum Schltdl. & Cham.
- Desmodium polygaloides Chodat & Hassl.
- Desmodium polystachyum Schltdl.
- Desmodium prehensile Schltdl.
- Desmodium pringlei S.Watson
- Desmodium procumbens (Mill.) C.L.Hitchc.
- Desmodium prodigum (Schindl.) Standl.
- Desmodium prostratum Brandegee
- Desmodium pryonii DC.
- Desmodium pseudoamplifolium Micheli
- Desmodium psilocarpum A.Gray
- Desmodium psilophyllum Schltdl.
- Desmodium purpusianum (Schindl.) B. G. Schub.
- Desmodium purpusii Brandegee
- Desmodium rammossisimum G. Don
- Desmodium raymundoramirezii L.Torres & A.Delgado
- Desmodium repandum(Vahl) DC.
- Desmodium retinens Schltdl.
- Desmodium rhynchodesmum (S.F.Blake) Standl.
- Desmodium riedelii (Schindl.) Burkart
- Desmodium rosei B.G.Schub.
- Desmodium rotundifolium DC.
- Desmodium saccatum B.G.Schub.
- Desmodium salicifolium (Poir.) DC.
- Desmodium saxatile (C.V.Morton) B.G.Schub. & McVaugh
- Desmodium scalare B.G.Schub. & McVaugh
- Desmodium schindleri B.G.Schub.
- Desmodium schubertianum Standl. & L.O.Williams
- Desmodium schusteri (Schindl.) Standl.
- Desmodium sclerophyllum Benth.
- Desmodium scopulorum S.Watson
- Desmodium scorpiurus (Sw.) Desv. ex DC.
- Desmodium scutatum Hemsl.
- Desmodium seatonii Greenm.
- Desmodium seleri (Schindl.) Standl. & Steyerm.
- Desmodium sericeum (Schindl.) Standl.
- Desmodium sericocarpum Hemsl.
- Desmodium sericophyllum Schltdl.
- Desmodium serotinum (Willd.) DC.
- Desmodium sessilifolium (Torr. ex M.A.Curtis) Torr. & A.Gray
- Desmodium siamense (Schindl.) Craib
- Desmodium skinneri Benth.
- Desmodium strictum (Pursh) DC.
- Desmodium strigillosum Schindl.
- Desmodium subrosum G.L.Nesom
- Desmodium subsecundum Vogel
- Desmodium subsericeum Malme
- Desmodium subsessile Schltdl.
- Desmodium substipulaceum Blume ex Kurz
- Desmodium subtile Hemsl.
- Desmodium sumichrastii (Schindl.) Standl.
- Desmodium sylvicola Brandegee
- Desmodium tanganyikense Baker
- Desmodium tastense Brandegee
- Desmodium tenax Schindl.
- Desmodium tenuifolium Torr. & A.Gray
- Desmodium tenuipes (S.F.Blake) B.G.Schub.
- Desmodium tortuosum (Sw.) DC.
- Desmodium triarticulatum Malme
- Desmodium tweedyi Britton
- Desmodium uncinatum (Jacq.) DC.
- Desmodium urarioides (S.F.Blake) B.G.Schub. & McVaugh
- Desmodium vargasianum B.G.Schub.
- Desmodium varians (Labill.) G.Don
- Desmodium venosum Vogel
- Desmodium venustum Steud.
- Desmodium vidalii H.Ohashi
- Desmodium viridiflorum (L.) DC.
- Desmodium volubile (Schindl.) B.G.Schub. & McVaugh
- Desmodium weberbaueri (Schindl.) J.F.Macbr.
- Desmodium wydlerianum Urb.
- Desmodium xylopodium Greenm.
- Desmodium yungasense Britton

== Moved species ==
- Desmodium velutinum (Willd.) DC. has been now moved to a separate monotypic genus Polhillides velutina (Willd.) H.Ohashi & K.Ohashi.
