= Desmodium perplexum =

Conservation status
- Secure (NatureServe)

Scientific classification
- Kingdom: Plantae
- Clade: Tracheophytes
- Clade: Angiosperms
- Clade: Eudicots
- Clade: Rosids
- Order: Fabales
- Family: Fabaceae
- Subfamily: Faboideae
- Genus: Desmodium
- Species: D. perplexum

Binomial name
- Desmodium perplexum B.G.Schub.

Synonyms
- Desmodium boottii Torr.; Meibomia boottii (Torr.) Schindl.

Species of flowering plant

Desmodium perplexum is a species of flowering plant in the legume family Fabaceae. It is native to eastern North America. The specific name perplexum refers to the confusion surrounding this species since its initial description in 1950.

Desmodium perplexum is similar in appearance to Desmodium glabellum. The two species remained a source of confusion for botanists until a more reliable identification key became available in 2020. Consequently, much of the information published prior to that date tends to be misleading.

== Description ==
Desmodium perplexum is a herbaceous perennial plant. It has trifoliate leaves with petioles at least 10 mm (0.39 in) long. Its fruit is a type of legume called a loment that separates into single-seeded segments with hooked hairs that stick to fur and clothing.

Desmodium perplexum is morphologically similar to Desmodium glabellum. The two species may be distinguished by a combination of fruiting and vegetative characters:

	Desmodium glabellum	Desmodium perplexum
Fruit shape	The lower (ventral) margins of most segments are straight to slightly convex (angular segments)	The ventral margins of most segments are concave (rounded segments)
Leaf arrangement	Going up the stem, the leaves are gradually but noticeably reduced in size and petiole length, often with small leaves extending onto the flowering branches	Going up the stem, the leaves are mostly the same size and do not (or slightly) extend onto the flowering branches (the few leaves that do extend onto the flowering branches are reduced in size but abruptly so)
Leaf shape	Terminal leaflets are lanceolate to broadly ovate (most specimens, especially of full sun habitats, are on the narrow end of this range), broadest nearer the base than the middle	Terminal leaflets are narrowly ovate to broadly elliptic-ovate (most specimens are on the wider end of this range), broadest nearer the middle than the base

== Taxonomy ==
Desmodium perplexum was first described by the American botanist Bernice Schubert in 1950. The type specimen was collected by Fernald and Long in Sussex County, Virginia in September 1945. The specific name perplexum refers to the "perplexity of botanists" concerned with the taxon known as Desmodium dillenii Darl. As "the least clearly understood species of the genus", Schubert declared Desmodium dillenii to be a nomen confusum (i.e., a "confusing name") and then attempted to resolve the confusion by splitting the taxon into two distinct taxa, one of which became Desmodium perplexum B.G.Schub. The other taxon was recognized as Desmodium glabellum (Michx.) DC. The name Desmodium dillenii is a synonym for Desmodium glabellum, not Desmodium perplexum.

Desmodium perplexum is a member of the Desmodium paniculatum complex, a group of closely related taxa that also includes Desmodium paniculatum sensu stricto, Desmodium glabellum, Desmodium fernaldii, and the synonym Desmodium dillenii. Alternatively, some botanists lump these taxa into a single polymorphic species, Desmodium paniculatum sensu lato, in which case Desmodium perplexum becomes a synonym of Desmodium paniculatum.

== Distribution and habitat ==
Desmodium perplexum is native to eastern North America. In the United States, its range extends from southern Maine, west to Iowa, south to eastern Texas, and eastward into Georgia. In Canada, members of the Desmodium paniculatum complex are known to occur in Ontario and Quebec, but since Desmodium perplexum is recognized as a synonym of Desmodium paniculatum in Canada, the occurrence of Desmodium perplexum is unknown.

Various sources disagree about the distribution of Desmodium perplexum in North America. This is likely due to the lack of an identification key that can reliably differentiate between Desmodium perplexum and Desmodium glabellum. Using a key published in 2020, almost 60% of the herbarium specimens in Missouri were found to be incorrectly identified. Based on the resulting reclassification, Desmodium glabellum was found to be distributed throughout most of Missouri, while Desmodium perplexum was shown to be confined to the Ozarks in the southeastern half of the state. Using the same key, Desmodium glabellum is thought to be considerably more common than Desmodium perplexum in Pennsylvania, a recent claim that contradicts previous knowledge.

== Bibliography ==
- Darlington, William (1837). Flora cestrica: an attempt to enumerate and describe the flowering and filicoid plants of Chester County, in the state of Pennsylvania. West-Chester, Penn: S. Siegfried. pp. i–xxiii, 1–640.
- Isely, Duane (November 1983). "The Desmodium paniculatum (L.) DC. (Fabaceae) complex revisited". SIDA, Contributions to Botany. 10 (2): 142–158. JSTOR 23909545.
- Schubert, Bernice G. (June 1950). "Desmodium: Preliminary Studies—III". Rhodora. 52 (618): 135–155.
- Thomas, Justin R. (2020). "Desmodium glabellum and D. perplexum (Fabaceae): a morphological reevaluation" (PDF). Missouriensis. 38. Missouri Native Plant Society: 29–50.
- Weakley, Alan S.; Poindexter, Derick B.; Sorrie, Bruce A.; Ungberg, Eric A.; Ward, Scott G.; Horn, James W.; Knapp, Wesley M.; Grund, Steven P. (2022). "Studies in the vascular flora of the southeastern United States. VIII". Journal of the Botanical Research Institute of Texas. 16 (2): 377–418. doi:10.17348/jbrit.v16.i2.1257.
