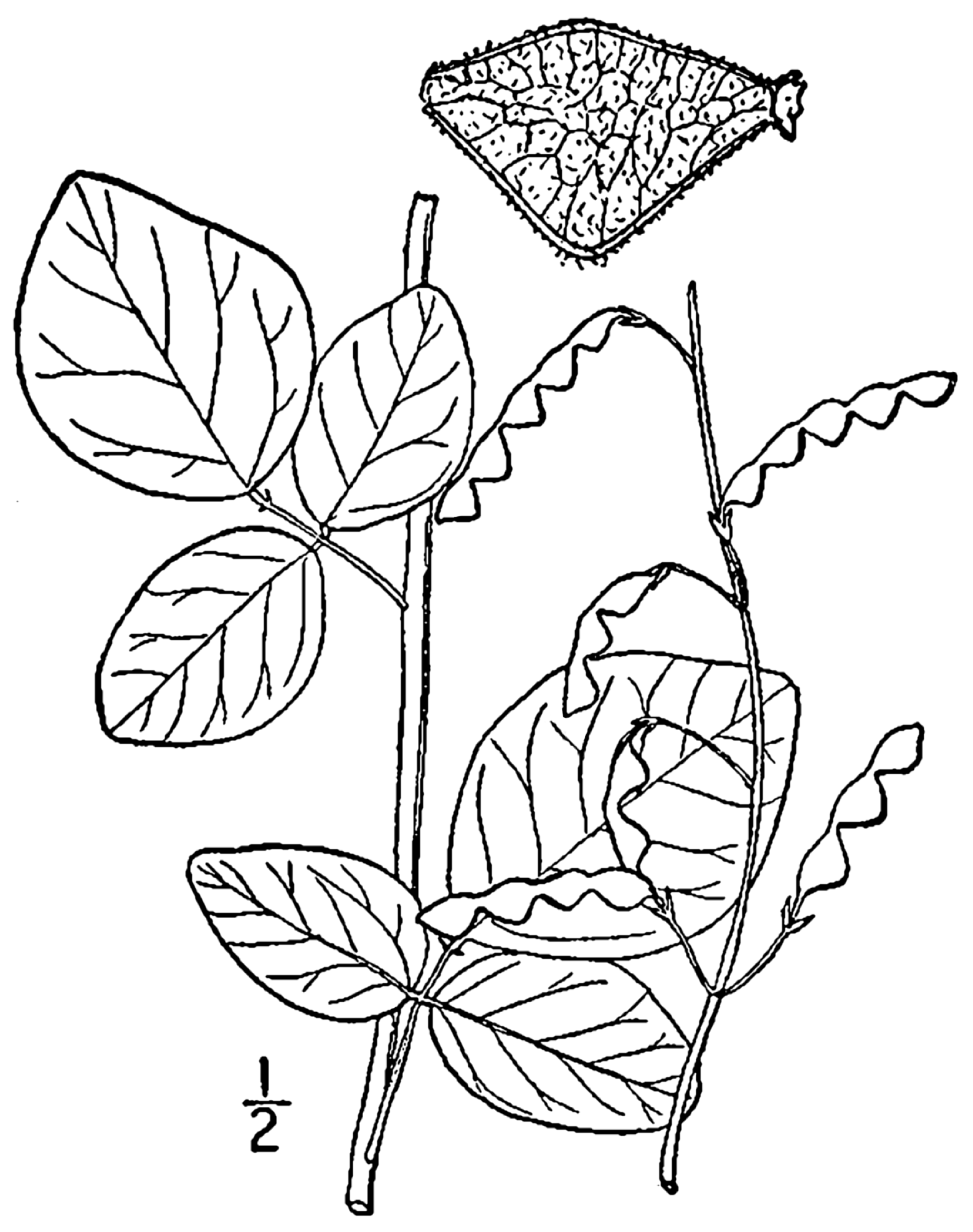
- Illustration published in 1913

Conservation status
- Secure (NatureServe)

Scientific classification
- Kingdom: Plantae
- Clade: Tracheophytes
- Clade: Angiosperms
- Clade: Eudicots
- Clade: Rosids
- Order: Fabales
- Family: Fabaceae
- Subfamily: Faboideae
- Genus: Desmodium
- Species: D. glabellum

Binomial name
- Desmodium glabellum (Michx.) DC.

Synonyms
- Homotypic synonyms: Hedysarum glabellum Michx.; Heterotypic synonyms: Desmodium dillenii Darl.; Desmodium paniculatum var. dillenii (Darl.) Isely; Meibomia dillenii (Darl.) Kuntze; Meibomia glabella Kuntze; Pleurolobus dillenii (Darl.) MacMill.

= Desmodium glabellum =

Species of legume

Desmodium glabellum is a species of flowering plant in the legume family Fabaceae. It is native to the eastern and central United States. It is commonly called Dillenius' tick-trefoil in honor of Johann Dillenius, a British botanist of German birth. It is also known as the tall tick-trefoil.

== Description ==
Desmodium glabellum is a herbaceous perennial plant. It grows to 5 feet tall with alternate palmately trifoliate leaves. Light pink to purplish flowers appear June through September. Seeds in sticky pods arranged in a row of 2-5 segments appear August–October. This species is very similar to Desmodium perplexum from which it was recently split.

== Taxonomy ==
Desmodium glabellum was first described as Hedysarum glabellum by the French botanist André Michaux in 1803. The type specimen was collected in a grassland in "Lower Carolina". Michaux described the stem of the species as nearly glabrous, hence the specific name glabellum and the corresponding common name smooth tick-trefoil (not to be confused with Desmodium laevigatum, which also goes by that common name). In 1825, the Swiss botanist Augustin de Candolle placed Hedysarum glabellum Michx. in genus Desmodium, and so Hedysarum glabellum is a basionym for Desmodium glabellum (Michx.) DC.

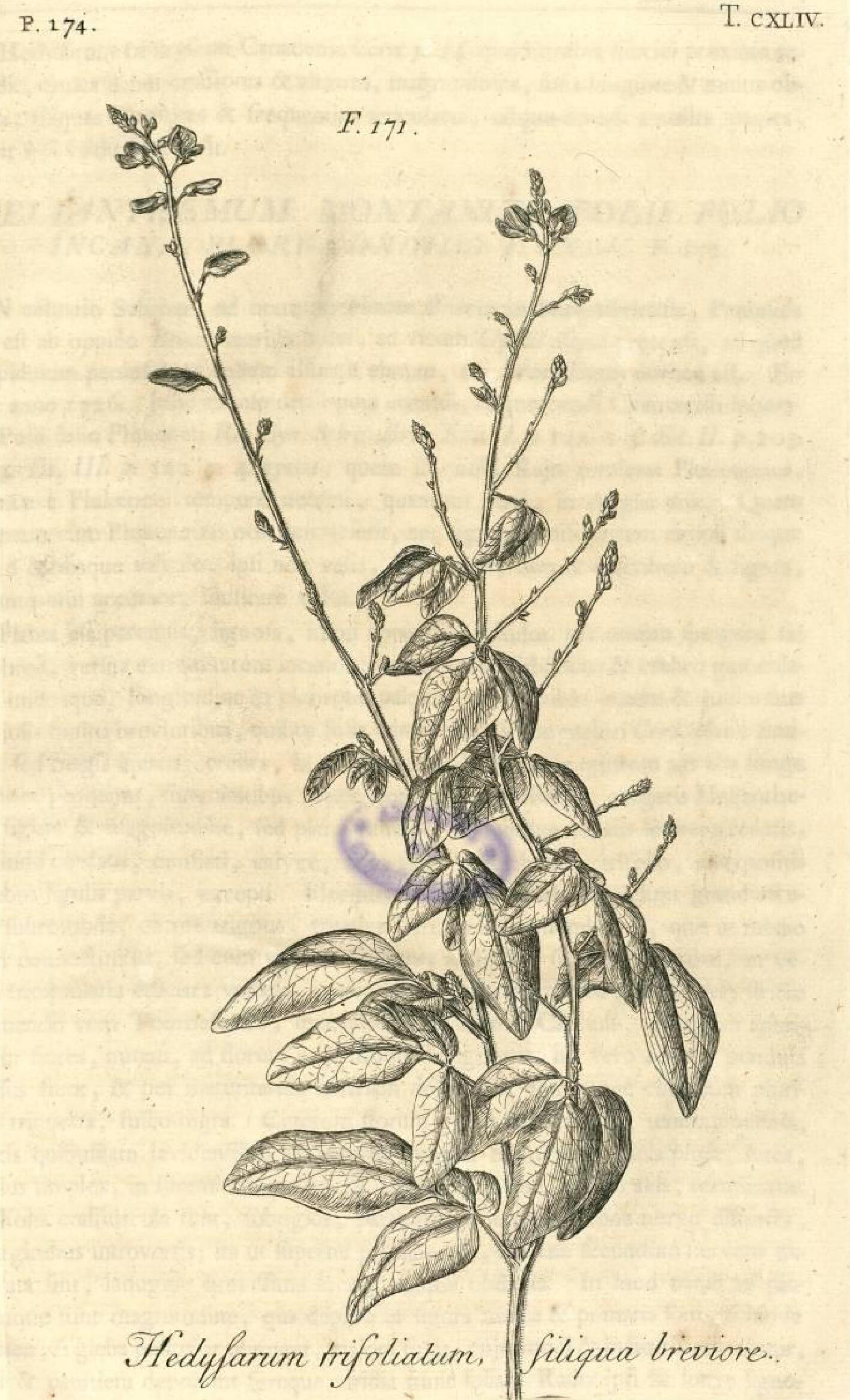
Type illustration of Desmodium dillenii designated by Darlington in 1837, originally published by Dillenius in 1732, identified as Desmodium glabellum in 2022

The American physician, botanist, and politician William Darlington described Desmodium dillenii in 1837. Darlington's description was based upon an illustration of Hedysarum trifoliatum published by the German-born British botanist Johann Jacob Dillenius in 1732. Recognizing Dillenius' contribution, Darlington referred to Desmodium dillenii as Dillenius's Desmodium. In 1950, the American botanist Bernice Schubert rejected Desmodium dillenii Darl. as a nomen confusum (a term having no standing in the International Code of Nomenclature of 2018), which means "confusing name". In an attempt to resolve the confusion, Schubert split the taxon into two distinct taxa, a newly described Desmodium perplexum, and the previously described Desmodium glabellum. However, Schubert did not identify the plant in Dillenius' illustration. The matter remained unresolved until 2020 when the morphologies of the taxa in question were sufficiently clarified. Subsequently the plant in Dillenius' illustration was identified as Desmodium glabellum, and hence the name Desmodium dillenii Darl. is a synonym for Desmodium glabellum (Michx.) DC. The common name Dillenius' tick-trefoil is often used to refer to Desmodium glabellum.

Desmodium glabellum is a member of the Desmodium paniculatum complex, a group of closely related taxa that also includes Desmodium paniculatum sensu stricto, Desmodium perplexum, Desmodium fernaldii, and the synonym Desmodium dillenii. Alternatively, some botanists lump these taxa into a single polymorphic species, Desmodium paniculatum sensu lato, in which case Desmodium glabellum becomes a synonym of Desmodium paniculatum.

== Distribution and habitat ==
Desmodium glabellum is native to the eastern and central United States. It grows in fields, woodland borders, and disturbed areas.

== Bibliography ==
- Darlington, William (1837). Flora cestrica: an attempt to enumerate and describe the flowering and filicoid plants of Chester County, in the state of Pennsylvania. West-Chester, Penn: S. Siegfried. pp. i–xxiii, 1–640.
- Dillenius, Johann Jacob (1732). Hortus Elthamensis seu plantarum rariorum quas in horto suo Elthami in Cantio coluit Vir Ornatissimus et Praestantissimus Jacobus Sherard…delineationes et descriptiones quarum historia vel plane non, vel imperfecte a rei herbariae scriptoribus tradita fuit. Vol. 1. London: Sumptibus auctoris. pp. i–viii, 1–206.
- Michaux, André (March 1803). Flora Boreali-Americana. Vol. 2. Paris and Strasbourg.
- Schubert, Bernice G. (June 1950). "Desmodium: Preliminary Studies—III". Rhodora. 52 (618): 135–155.
- Thomas, Justin R. (2020). "Desmodium glabellum and D. perplexum (Fabaceae): a morphological reevaluation" (PDF). Missouriensis. 38. Missouri Native Plant Society: 29–50.
- Weakley, Alan S.; Poindexter, Derick B.; Sorrie, Bruce A.; Ungberg, Eric A.; Ward, Scott G.; Horn, James W.; Knapp, Wesley M.; Grund, Steven P. (2022). "Studies in the vascular flora of the southeastern United States. VIII". Journal of the Botanical Research Institute of Texas. 16 (2): 377–418. doi:10.17348/jbrit.v16.i2.1257.
