= Odontota horni =

Scientific classification
- Kingdom: Animalia
- Phylum: Arthropoda
- Class: Insecta
- Order: Coleoptera
- Suborder: Polyphaga
- Infraorder: Cucujiformia
- Family: Chrysomelidae
- Genus: Odontota
- Species: O. horni

Binomial name
- Odontota horni J. Smith, 1885

Synonyms
- Chalepus smithi Donckier, 1899

Species of beetle

Odontota horni, the soybean leafminer, is a species of leaf beetle in the family Chrysomelidae. It is found in North America, where it has been recorded from the United States (Alabama, Arkansas, Connecticut, District of Columbia, Georgia, Illinois, Indiana, Iowa, Kansas, Kentucky, Louisiana, Maryland, Massachusetts, Michigan, Mississippi, Missouri, Nebraska, New Jersey, New York, North Carolina, Ohio, Oklahoma, Rhode Island, South Carolina, Texas, Virginia, West Virginia, Wisconsin).

== Biology ==
They have been recorded feeding on Desmodium rigidum, Desmodium canescens, Desmodium illinoense, Tephrosia virginiana and Glycine max.
