= Desmodium tweedyi =

Scientific classification
- Kingdom: Plantae
- Clade: Tracheophytes
- Clade: Angiosperms
- Clade: Eudicots
- Clade: Rosids
- Order: Fabales
- Family: Fabaceae
- Subfamily: Faboideae
- Genus: Desmodium
- Species: D. tweedyi

Binomial name
- Desmodium tweedyi Britton
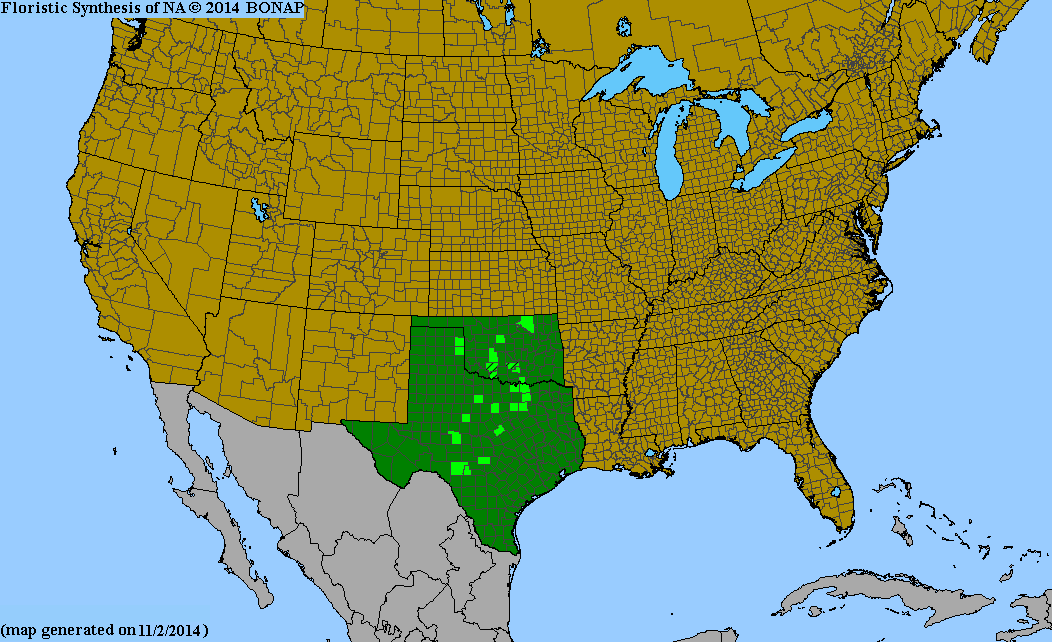
- Distribution map created by Biota of North America Program (BONAP), J.T. Kartesz

Species of legume

Desmodium tweedyi is an herbaceous flowering plant in the pea family native to northern Texas and southern Oklahoma popularly known as "Tweedy's ticktrefoil" or "tick-clover." The legume or seed pod it produces has given the species its common names from its ability to cling to clothing. Along with other species in the Desmodium genus, D. tweedyi has become a candidate for soil enrichment, suppression of insect pests, mulch and green manure production, and making "good fodder for animals including bobwhite, turkey, grouse, deer, cattle and goats."

== Botanical description and etymology ==
Botanical publications describe this plant species as "Desmodium tweedyi Britton," for its scientific name (Desmodium tweedyi), its genus (Desmodium), its specific epithet (tweedyi), and the botanist who first identified it (Nathaniel Lord Britton). Desmodium is derived from the Greek word desmos which means "bond, fetter, or chain," referring to the connected segments of the fruit (legume) giving it a chain-like appearance. "Tweedyi" is a Latinized version of Frank Tweedy's last name – the topographer and botanist in whose honor this species was named, after he collected the first specimen on record.

== Plant taxonomy ==
=== Introducing the kingdom ===
At the top of the taxonomy or scientific classification for Desmodium tweedyi is the kingdom of plants (Plantae), this being one of an estimated 374,000 plant species on earth – vascular plants that conduct water, sap, and nutrients occupying 82% and flowering plants 79% of that total. D. tweedyi's striking flower is pictured here.

=== A fundamental debate ===
A close look at the taxonomy offered here illustrates a major debate in the field of botany, with an older category in the plant kingdom such as Embryophyte for all land plants on earth, ranked as Subkingdom, followed by the five unranked "clades" or monophyletic groups composed of a single common ancestor with all its lineal descendants. The traditional taxonomy system sometimes referred to as "Linnaean classification" put each species in a hierarchy of formal ranks, each identified using binomial nomenclature – for example, the scientific name Desmodium tweedyi including the genus and epithet. These older groupings are often "polyphyletic," containing taxa descended from more than one ancestor. In contrast, the five unranked clades utilize "phylogenetic nomenclature" or classification based on chromosomal studies, electron microscopy, or molecular biology -- a revolution that began with Charles Darwin -- in which the older ranking and nomenclature has theoretically been superseded.

=== A working compromise ===
However, given the present state of the science, many botanists recommend a compromise to prevent a "whole-scale change of names of organisms" with the ensuing confusion which that would create. Botanist P. C. van Welzen offered the following advice:

I think, therefore, that the best solution is to choose the second option that Brummitt (1997) provides in his paper, namely, "retaining Linnaean classification, with paraphyletic taxa [including the common ancestor and some, but not all, of its descendants], but developing alongside it an independent clade-based dichotomous system with its own separate nomenclature."

The Angiosperm Phylogeny Group (APG) was formed in 1997 by an international group of botanists to work toward a consensus on the taxonomy of flowering plants, based on clades and a study of phylogenetics. The five (unranked) clades listed here in the Taxonomy for Desmodium tweedyi emerged from the most recent APG classifications -- APG III and APG IV.

=== Five (unranked) clades ===
Five clades narrow down to the Desmodium tweedyi family and species, first that of vascular plants (Tracheophytes); second, the clade of all flowering plants (Angiosperms); then the clade of flowering plants with two seeds on germination (Eudicots); fourthly, the clade made up of about a quarter of all flowering plants with significant fossil records originating in the Cretaceous period 125 to 100 million years ago (Rosids); and then an important fifth "nitrogen-fixing clade" (Fabids), which emerged and includes four orders of flowering plants that carry this special trait. D. tweedyi is one of the species that has retained it.

=== Species' order (Fabales) ===
One of those four orders in the Fabid clade is Fabales, and the similar characteristics of this large order of flowering plants was described as early as 1838 by Sir Edward Bromhead (1789-1855), hence the botanical name Fabales Bromhead. These plants are "inclined to a tropical habitat," by his account; they have many flowers clustered on a stem referred to by botanists as "inflorescence," a flowering group or cluster on a stem. And of the plant's fruit he said the following: "Fruit leguminous [seeds in a pod or chain] or rarely drupaceous [as a cherry seed with a hard pit] or samaroid [as in a winged seed vessel]."

=== Family (Fabaceae) ===
The Fabaceae family is "cosmopolitan," present in arid to tropical, grassland and coastal environments, absent only from Antarctica. As the third largest family of flowering plants -- with 730 genera and 19,500 species -- it is economically important with food sources for beans, peas, peanuts, and soybean. Typical features of the family include nitrogen metabolism in the roots and fruit (legumes) which give the family its alternate name (Leguminosae).

=== Subfamily (Faboideae) and tribe (Desmodieae) ===
Reflecting change in the science of Botany, the Sixth International Legume Conference was held in South Africa in 2013 with the theme "Towards a New Classification System for Legumes." In 2017 the Legume Phylogeny Working Group formed at that conference announced its taxonomic change in the Fabaceae or legume family from three to six subfamilies, D. tweedyi located in one of the new classifications, Faboideae (or Papilionoideae). Members of this broad subfamily include trees, shrubs, and herbaceous plants. The list of all 503 Faboideae genera includes Desmodium, with nitrogen-fixing root nodules present in many of its 14,000 species. The diagram of a complex tree posted on the website for Faboideae –- and continued on a second website for one of this subfamily's tribes (Desmodieae) -- spans at least six more clade branches, not included here. Phylogenetic research has begun to publish major changes to this part of the Tree of Life.

=== Genus (Desmodium) ===
The Desmodium genus is made up of 450 species which occur mostly in warm areas of the world, especially in Asia, Brazil, and Mexico, but also in the southwestern U. S. The fruit (legumes) of this genus has generated additional common names such as "Tick-clover, Beggar's-lice, and Beggar's-ticks," because these legumes "fall into 1-seeded segments which stick to hair or clothing, hence the common names." Another Desmodium nick-name is "hitch-hiker." This article includes a link to this genus's list of species, one of which is D. tweedyi.

=== Species (Desmodium tweedyi) ===
Desmodium tweedyi, of course, is a member of all these ranked groups and unranked clades, carrying most but not all the attributes or characteristics of its "parent" and "ancestor" predecessors. Classifications for the leaves, flowers, and fruit -- the latter forming is distinctive desmos or "chain" of 3 to 5 seeds, closely characterize the family tree. This seed pod or legume has invited agricultural interest in the species, to be outlined in the "history of research" section. With many of the other Desmodium species, this one has retained the important trait of the fifth "nitrogen-fixing clade" of Fabids, which is certainly part of what makes it attractive for farming and conservationists. Meibomia tweedyi is the only species synonym or alternate botanical name, to date. This is part of the history for this species and will be described under the research heading.

=== An important note ===
The Christenhusz and Bing article inventorying the world's plants estimated that ca 2000 new species are described each year, with some concern that "the rate of discovery is slowing down, due to reduction in financial and scientific support for fundamental natural history studies."

== Plant form ==
The Desmodium tweedyi plant species has been described with stem standing erect up to four feet high, its leaves 1 to 4.5 inches in width -- the widest (ovate) part at the base and rhombic-elliptic to egg-shaped – the leaves with long, soft, strait leaf-hairs (pilose) and raised veins in a spreading (pubescent) network beneath. The plant stalk supporting the blade (petiole) is 1.5 to 3.5 inches long, the stalk (pedicel) supporting individual flowers in the cluster (inflorescence) 0.4 to 0.9 inches long (Picture B). Flower petals (corollas) are white (picture A). Fruit segments 0.2 to 0.3 inches long are distinctly flat, breaking into two to six segments, with hooked hairs characteristic of all species in the Desmodium genus, causing them to stick to hair or clothing. Leaflets grow in clusters of three (tripinnate) distributed along both sides of an elongate axis attached to the main stalk, each leaf distinctly colored with a large conspicuous pale to whitish area along the midvein, as in the picture labeled D. Leaflet clusters attach to the main stalk with a small appendage (stipel). The flower cluster's "inflorescence axis" occurs "with short hooked hairs, petals white with greenish or yellowish tinge, sometimes with lavender base."

In a specimen collected in 1879 by the species' namesake, Frank Tweedy, Nathaniel L. Britton described the fruit pod (legume) as follows: "Joints of the pod rhombic [parallelogram-shape], minutely canescent [glowing], slightly raised in the calyx [enlargement over seed], resembling those of D. canescens, to which species the plant appears to be most nearly related. The only pod on the specimen examined consists of but three joints." Picture C of the D. tweedyi collection here displays four seed segments in the plant legume. The report of Tweedy's specimen now housed in New York Botanical Garden's Steele Herbarium is pictured with this article.

== Plant growth and ecology ==
Desmodium tweedyi grows in thickets in limestone areas in central Texas from "Blackland Prairie west to Rolling Plains and Edwards Plateau." Flowering followed by fruit legumes occur early in June to July. Typical habitat consists of calcareous or carbonate sandy loam near creeks and rivers. D. tweedyi has become the subject in a number of research studies and is a candidate in farm plantings for animal fodder and soil enrichment.

== Geographical distribution ==
This plant species is found in north-central Texas with a total range extent of from 8,000 up to one million square miles, and thus endemic or limited to one State within one nation, a very small area in terms of the global scale. Reports of the species' presence in southern Oklahoma are doubted by Kartesz and Meacham. However, 25 of the 66 specimens of Desmodium tweedyi held in American herbaria for the period of years from 1872 to 2015 were collected in Oklahoma, confirming this State as part of this species' geographical range. The map of the distribution for this species above shows the states of Texas and Oklahoma.

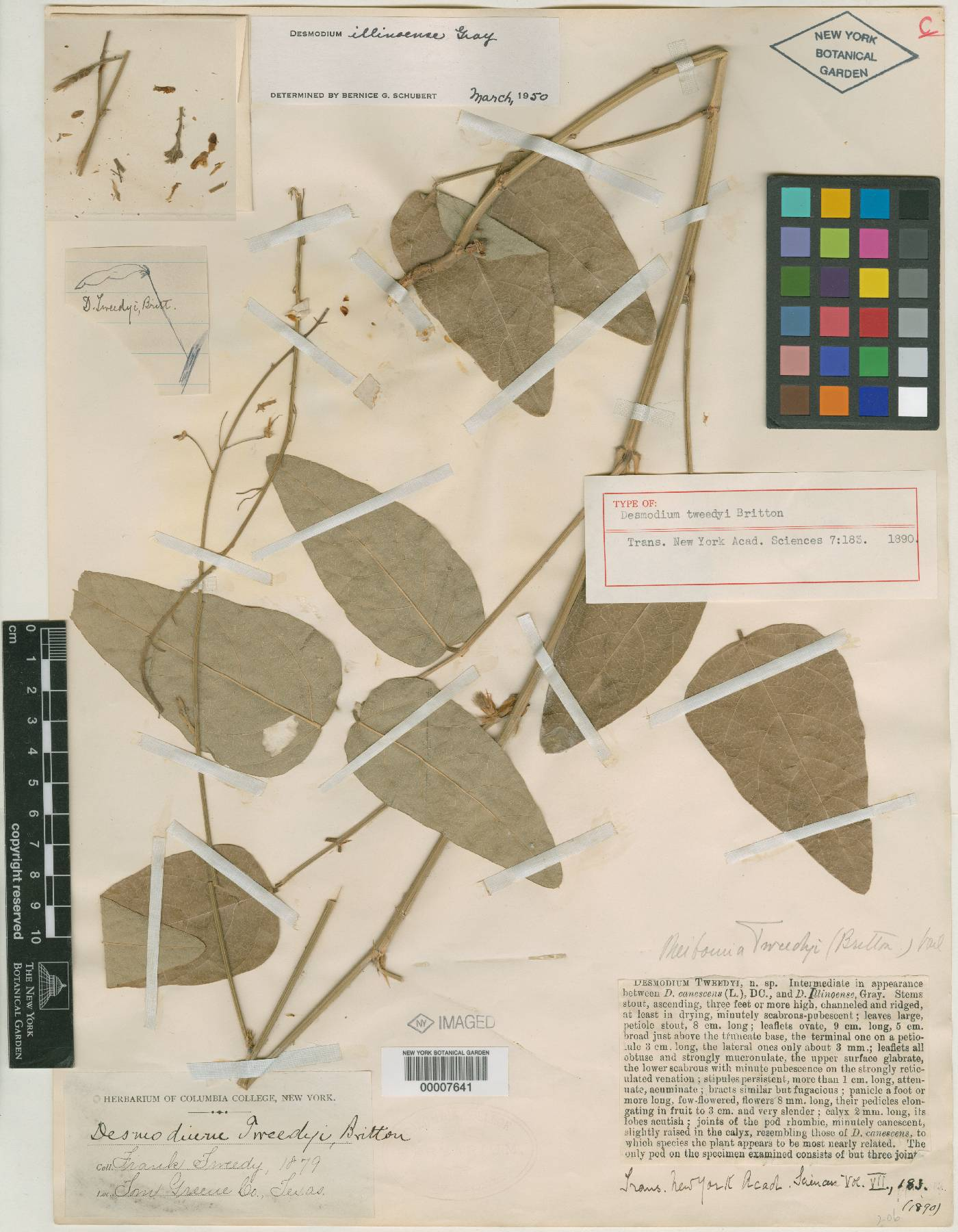
Collected by Frank Tweedy in Tom Greene Co., TX, in 1879, now in New York Botanical Garden's Steere Herbarium

This species has been named in honor of Frank Tweedy (1854-1937) -- topographer with the United States Geological Survey and a serious botanist with over 6000 species now housed in herbaria (singular herbarium) around the US and Canada. Desmodium tweedyi is one of 99 specimens Tweedy collected in Texas, listed by botanist Nathaniel Lord Britton in an 1890 journal article of the New York Academy of Sciences. Frank's specimens are largely from his work with the USGS in the Rocky Mountains, with smaller collections from his work in the Adirondack Mountains of New York State, and his residences in Rhode Island and New Jersey. This Texas collection originated during his visits to his brother Joseph Lord Tweedy (1849-1928) who moved from New York City in 1876, becoming one of the founding pioneers of Knickerbocker, Texas. His 20,000-acre sheep farm there was located in Tom Green County, Texas, 278 miles southwest of Dallas. Tom Green County, where Tweedy first collected it, is in the middle of this species' distribution zone.

== Research history ==
=== Species discovery ===
The full botanical name "Desmodium tweedyi Britton" identifies noted New York Botanical Garden botanist Nathaniel Lord Britton as the person who reviewed and documented this species' discovery. Britton's May article in "Transactions of the New York Academy of Sciences" discussing Frank Tweedy's Texas specimens collected in 1879 -- including one of Desmodium tweedyi -- does not actually reveal how and why this species was dedicated to Tweedy. However, a notice in Torrey's Botanical Bulletin for October 1890 -- also authored by Britton -- referred to Frank's Texas collecting, with the following addition: "Note on some plants collected by Mr. Frank Tweedy in Greene County in 1879, an enumeration of ninety-nine species, Desmodium Tweedyi being described as new." Tweedy's habit of consulting noted botanists with species he suspected might be new is evident in this case. Clearly Tweedy sent this specimen to Britton for identification, and this NYBG botanist made the determination that it was a new species in the Desmodium genus, naming it in honor of its first collector. That scientific name has held up under botanical scrutiny, though the species does have one alternately named specimen -- referred to as a "synonym" -- with more than a few misidentifications on record.

=== Classification confusion ===
The search for Desmodium tweedyi plants using the Mid-Atlantic Herbaria Consortium website returned 66 specimens, with the two oldest ones dating to 1872 and 1879 -- the latter Frank Tweedy's specimen from Tom Green County, Texas. The 1872 specimen was collected by one Elihu Hall in that same State, originally labeled as a different species, penciled with an unreadable name. Several notes attached to this report reveal a debate over its identification, with a 1946 note labeling it "Desmodium illinoense Gray" (Tohoku University Herbarium, Japan), but a more recent 2010 note with the final label, "Desmodium tweedyi Britton" (Harvard University Herbaria). Interestingly, Tweedy's own specimen revealed the same confusion, with three notes attached -- Britton's new species' name, a 1950 note signed by Harvard University botanist Bernice Giduz Schubert (1913-2000) labeling it "Desmodium illinoense Gray," and then the final determination, D. tweedyi Britton.

These notes reveal an interesting journey for this Tweedy discovery from Texas to Britton in NYC, to a botanist at Harvard University, and then to the New York Botanical Garden -- where the Steere Herbarium holds this find with the second largest collection of plants in the world, 7.8 million specimens! Britton's earlier description of Desmodium tweedyi in a NY Academy of Sciences publication offered an explanation for the confusion, when he described D. tweedyi as "Intermediate in appearance between D. canescens (L.), DC., and D. illinoense, Gray." Clearly, these three Desmodiums are close in appearance, and in many of their attributes.

A 1977 Masters research project done by a Texas resident, John Williams, titled "Biosystematic Study of a Desmodium Complex," aimed to sort out the interrelationships between the three species that have been commonly confused in the past -- D. canescens, D. tweedyi, and D illinoense. Using morphological evidence, reproductive biology, cytological evidence (chromosome counts), and palynological evidence (pollen size and shape), this researcher concluded that the two species that really are close are the former two, with D. illinoense the outlier; in fact, based on cross-breeding of the former two, he offered a new scientific name: Desmodium canescens var. tweedyi (Britt.) Williams. This researcher concluded the following: "The data suggest that D. tweedyi is not a distinct species but rather that it is more likely a geographical variant (the southwestern extreme) of D. canescens." That assessment has not become definitive, but this illustrates the challenges a plant collector faces with a genus with very similar species.

=== Species synonym (Meibomia tweedyi) ===
Anna Murray Vail (1883-1955) published an article in the Torrey Botanical Club's Bulletin in 1892 in which she noted marked similarities of the leaves, flowers, and fruit legumes in three genera, all members of the Fabaceae plant family -- Hedysarum, Meibomia, and Desmodium. She identified No. 19 of the 30 species discussed in this article as "Meibomia tweedyi (Britton) Vail." This new identification thus became a plant "synonym" for D. tweedyi, and remains a part of this plant's history. New names for over 70 other species were also assigned, many of them moved over from the Desmodium genus. Recent research has not held up this new name, but this, too, illustrates the challenges in identifying and categorizing similar species.

=== Agricultural interest ===
Desmodium tweedyi has also become a species of interest in agricultural research in recent years. In a 2004 study, D. tweedyi was evaluated with 14 other legume species for improving soil fertility, nitrogen fixation, and usage in "woodland restoration, deer plots, goat browse and cattle pastures" for Texas' central Cross Timbers region. D. tweedyi yielded 13% in "forage crude protein concentration" with adequate seed yields to guarantee soil seed banks. The study noted: "If wildlife enthusiasts and those purely interested in re-establishing native prairie and woodland bio-diversity show an interest, there may be a huge market for these native Texas legumes in the near future."

A 2008 study in Agronomy Journal evaluated D. tweedyi with two other Texas legumes for use in the southern US "for pastures, biomass production, wildlife plantings, rangeland reseeding, or native prairie restoration." D. tweedyi was found to contain high concentrations of nitrogen compared to other perennial legumes "and should improve the overall nutritive value of unfertilized grass stands used for ruminant production." "Ruminants" for animals which chew the cud, refer to the regurgitation of food as part of the digestion process. D. tweedyi was found to be least digestible due to its early flowering in June, increasing fiber concentration. Keeping acreage at a certain height, it was suggested, could minimize this negative.

=== Legumes on their evolutionary tree ===
Ground-breaking research reported in Plant Physiology based on newer cladist and evolutionary theory aimed to build and describe "The Legume Family Tree," which includes D. tweedyi's diverse family of Fabaceae (or Leguminosae). Several findings are of interest: (1) Where and when this legume family emerged is still somewhat of a mystery, but there is general agreement given the fossil record that all major lineages in the tree diverged from a common ancestor around 50 million years ago in the Eocene or mid-Tertiary geological periods; (2) the "incredible diversity" of the family "was built, step by mutational step, from the genome of this species;" (3) after dispersion of that genome when all continents were one, the direction of migration of legumes in the Americas is now north to south, not the reverse as earlier assumed; (4) root "nodulation" by nitrogen-fixing bacteria is neither universal among legumes nor confined to the family –- though D. tweedyi does possess this attribute; and (5) further research will be needed to explain the rich diversity in the Leguminosae family tree:

What makes a legume a legume and what makes the family so diverse are questions that are well worth asking and that can be answered only by working outward from the bridgehead provided by the current model legumes [pea, soybean, cowpea] to explore the rest of the iceberg.

== Conservation status ==
A conservation status for Desmodium tweedyi has been assigned by NatureServe scientists globally, nationally, and for its occurrence in Texas, but not yet in Oklahoma. It received a global status of G3 or "Vulnerable" in 2001 because this species is "at moderate risk of extinction or collapse due to a fairly restricted range, relatively few populations or occurrences, recent and widespread declines, threats, or other factors." The US has assigned it a rank of S3, also "Vulnerable" for similar reasons to the global rank: "At moderate risk of extirpation in the jurisdiction due to a fairly restricted range, relatively few populations or occurrences, recent and widespread declines, threats, or other factors." Oklahoma has designated the species SNR or unranked but needing assessment, Texas as S3, "Vulnerable" for the same reasons given for the global and national ranks. As an endemic in Texas and Oklahoma, Desmodium tweedyi is very limited in its distribution, and would benefit from conservation efforts and agricultural applications in a wider geographical range.

== See also ==
- List of Faboideae genera
- List of Desmodium species
- List of Frank Tweedy plant specimens
