= Odontota signaticollis =

Scientific classification
- Kingdom: Animalia
- Phylum: Arthropoda
- Class: Insecta
- Order: Coleoptera
- Suborder: Polyphaga
- Infraorder: Cucujiformia
- Family: Chrysomelidae
- Genus: Odontota
- Species: O. signaticollis

Binomial name
- Odontota signaticollis (Baly, 1885)

Synonyms
- Chalepus signaticollis Baly, 1885; Chalepus (Xenochalepus) latecincta Pic 1932; Xenochalepus (Neochalepus) signaticollis

Species of beetle

Odontota signaticollis is a species of beetle of the family Chrysomelidae. It is found in Honduras and Mexico (Mexico City, Durango, Puebla).

== Description ==
The face is angularly produced between the eyes, the front excavated and rugose. The antennae are rather longer than the head and thorax and slightly thickened towards the apex. The thorax is transverse, the sides obtusely rounded, converging from the base to the apex, more quickly so anteriorly, the apical angle armed with a short, oblique, obtuse tooth. The upper surface is subcylindrical and transversely plane, excavated on the hinder disc, closely covered with large variolose punctures. On either side on the anterior disc is a small rufous patch. The elytra are narrowly oblong-ovate, the sides nearly parallel, the apex regularly rounded, the outer margin entire, nitidous. Each elytron has ten, at the extreme base with eleven, rows of deep punctures, the interstices plane, the second interspace broad, flattened, the fourth and eighth moderately costate, the striae between these costae confused and less regularly arranged in the middle part of their course.

== Biology ==
The recorded food plants are Phaseolus species and Brassica oleracea.
