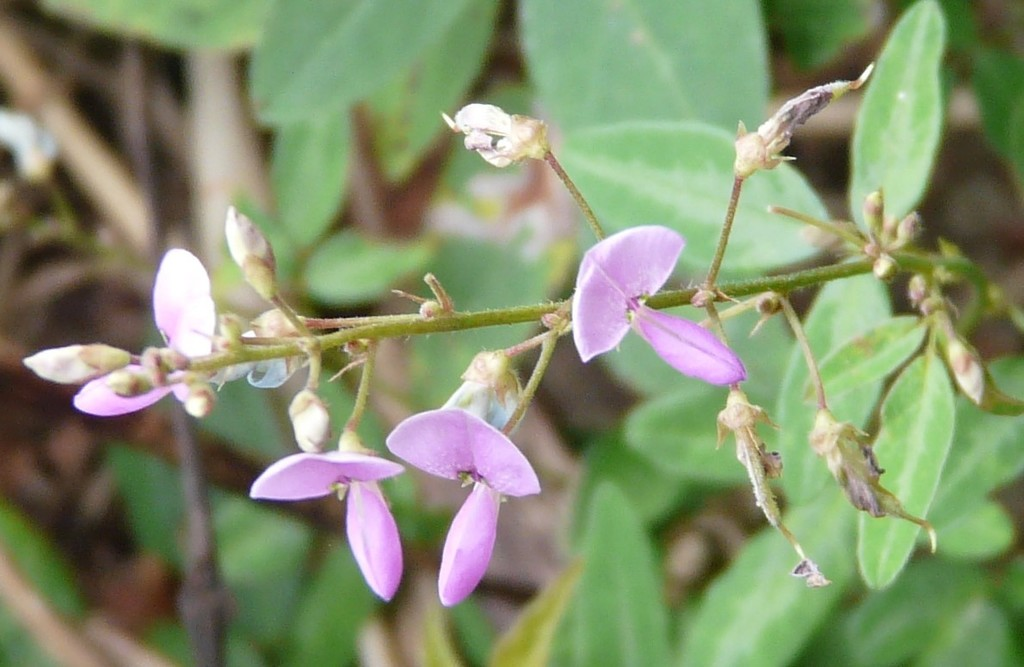

Conservation status
- Secure (NatureServe)

Scientific classification
- Kingdom: Plantae
- Clade: Embryophytes
- Clade: Tracheophytes
- Clade: Spermatophytes
- Clade: Angiosperms
- Clade: Eudicots
- Clade: Rosids
- Order: Fabales
- Family: Fabaceae
- Subfamily: Faboideae
- Genus: Desmodium
- Species: D. paniculatum

Binomial name
- Desmodium paniculatum (L.) DC.

Synonyms
- Homotypic synonyms: Hedysarum paniculatum L.; Meibomia paniculata (L.) Kuntze; Pleurolobus paniculatus (L.) MacMill.; Heterotypic synonyms: Desmodium dichromum Shinners; Desmodium paniculatum var. angustifolium Torr. & A.Gray; Desmodium paniculatum var. epetiolatum B.G.Schub.; Desmodium paniculatum var. pubens Torr. & A.Gray; Desmodium paniculatum var. typicum B.G.Schub.; Desmodium pubens (Torr. & A.Gray) M.J.Young; Hedysarum paniculatum var. obtusum Desv.; Meibomia chapmanii (Britton) Small; Meibomia paniculata var. angustifolia (Torr. & A.Gray) Vail; Meibomia paniculata var. chapmanii Britton; Meibomia paniculata var. obtusa (Desv.) Schindl.; Meibomia paniculata var. pubens (Torr. & A.Gray) Vail; Meibomia pubens (Torr. & A.Gray) Rydb.

= Desmodium paniculatum =

Species of legume

Desmodium paniculatum, the panicled-leaf ticktrefoil, narrow-leaf tick-trefoil or panicled tickclover, is a perennial herb in the pea family, Fabaceae. Belonging to a nearly cosmopolitan genus, the panicled-leaf ticktrefoil is a common native to Eastern North America, ranging from Quebec to Florida and as far West as Texas, Nebraska, and Ontario. The sticky loment can be found in disturbed areas that receive plenty of light, such as roadsides, parks, and abandoned fields.

== Description ==
Desmodium paniculatum grows to 3 feet tall in an erect and spreading habit with alternate, pinnately-trifoliolate leaves. The leaflets are lanceolate to oblong and are usually 2 to 10 times as long as wide. The pedicels are around 1 cm. The flowers of the paniculate inflorescence are light pinkish to lavender and appear June through September. The sticky loments that many people find attached to their shoes and pants are arranged in a row of 2-6 superiorly sinuate and inferiorly triangular segments and appear August–October.

== Taxonomy ==
Desmodium paniculatum was first described as Hedysarum paniculatum by the Swedish botanist Carl Linnaeus in 1753. In 1825, the Swiss botanist Augustin de Candolle placed Hedysarum paniculatum L. in genus Desmodium, and so Hedysarum paniculatum is a basionym for Desmodium paniculatum (L.) DC.

Desmodium paniculatum is a member of the Desmodium paniculatum complex, a group of closely related taxa that includes Desmodium paniculatum sensu stricto, Desmodium glabellum, Desmodium perplexum, and Desmodium fernaldii. Alternatively, some botanists lump the taxa into a single polymorphic species, Desmodium paniculatum sensu lato, in which case the taxa become synonyms or varieties of Desmodium paniculatum.

== Uses ==
While this species hasn't been tested for medically or commercially beneficial compounds like other species of Desmodium, studies have shown the value of this species, as well as other legumes, as a native forage for pasture use. While not as easily digestable and protein-rich as some non-native legumes and grasses, the panicled-leaf ticktrefoil can be a good source of protein-based fodder for livestock during the warmer months of the year.

== Bibliography ==
- Linnaeus, Carl (1753). Species Plantarum: exhibentes plantas rite cognitas, ad genera relatas, cum differentiis specificis, nominibus trivialibus, synonymis selectis, locis natalibus, secundum systema sexuale digestas (1st ed.). Stockholm: Impensis Laurentii Salvii.
- Thomas, Justin R. (2020). "Desmodium glabellum and D. perplexum (Fabaceae): a morphological reevaluation" (PDF). Missouriensis. 38. Missouri Native Plant Society: 29–50.
