= Odontota floridana =

Scientific classification
- Kingdom: Animalia
- Phylum: Arthropoda
- Class: Insecta
- Order: Coleoptera
- Suborder: Polyphaga
- Infraorder: Cucujiformia
- Family: Chrysomelidae
- Genus: Odontota
- Species: O. floridana

Binomial name
- Odontota floridana Butte, 1968

Species of beetle

Odontota floridana is a species of leaf beetle in the family Chrysomelidae. It is found in North America, where it has been recorded from the United States (Florida, North Carolina, South Carolina).
