= Odontota mundula =

Scientific classification
- Kingdom: Animalia
- Phylum: Arthropoda
- Class: Insecta
- Order: Coleoptera
- Suborder: Polyphaga
- Infraorder: Cucujiformia
- Family: Chrysomelidae
- Genus: Odontota
- Species: O. mundula

Binomial name
- Odontota mundula (Sanderson, 1951)

Synonyms
- Xenochalepus mundulus Sanderson, 1951

Species of beetle

Odontota mundula is a species of leaf beetle in the family Chrysomelidae. It is found in North America, where it has been recorded from Canada (Manitoba) and the United States (Alabama, Arkansas, Connecticut, District of Columbia, Georgia, Illinois, Indiana, Iowa, Kansas, Kentucky, Louisiana, Maryland, Massachusetts, Michigan, Minnesota, Mississippi, Missouri, Nebraska, New Jersey, New York, North Carolina, Oklahoma, Pennsylvania, Rhode Island, South Carolina, Virginia, West Virginia, Wisconsin).

== Biology ==
They have been recorded feeding on Amphicarpa bracteata.
