= Desmodium lineatum =

Scientific classification
- Kingdom: Plantae
- Clade: Tracheophytes
- Clade: Angiosperms
- Clade: Eudicots
- Clade: Rosids
- Order: Fabales
- Family: Fabaceae
- Subfamily: Faboideae
- Genus: Desmodium
- Species: D. lineatum

Binomial name
- Desmodium lineatum DC.

Species of plant

Desmodium lineatum, the matted tick-trefoil, is a trailing perennial species in the legume family native to the southeastern United States.

== Description ==
Desmodium lineatum has uncinate-pubescent to nearly glabrous stems ranging from 50 to 70 cm in length. Its terminal leaflets vary in shape—ovate, rhombic, obovate, elliptic, or orbicular—measuring 0.7–3 cm long and about three-quarters as wide, with surfaces ranging from glabrous to densely covered in hooked and short hairs. The stipules are lance-attenuate to linear-subulate, striate, and 2–5 mm long, while stipels are persistent. The inflorescences are paniculate and typically densely uncinulate-puberulent, with pedicels 6–16 mm long. Flowers have purplish petals (4–6 mm), a densely puberulent and sparsely pubescent calyx, and diadelphous stamens. The fruit is a stipitate loment with 2–3 segments (3.5–6 mm long, 2.5–3.5 mm wide), each segment straight to slightly curved above and rounded below, with densely hooked hairs on both surfaces and sutures. The stipe is longer than the calyx tube, about as long as the longest calyx lobe, and shorter than the staminal remnants. This species shares the genus's typical traits, such as entire stipellate leaflets, papilionaceous flowers subtended by bracts, and segmented, indehiscent loments.

== Distribution and habitat ==
Desmodium lineatum is found from southeast Maryland to northern peninsular Florida and west to Texas. It is rarely found inland. It grows in longleaf pine sandhills and other dry forests and woodlands. It is found in frequently burned upland shortleaf and longleaf pine native and old-field communities as well as fire excluded habitat, showing that it is not fully fire dependent. It has shown the ability to regrow in reestablished native longleaf pine habitat that was disturbed by agriculture.

== Diseases and parasites ==
Desmodium lineatum can be infected by root-knot nematodes such as Meloidogyne incognita, Meloidogyne arenaria, and Meloidogyne javanica.
