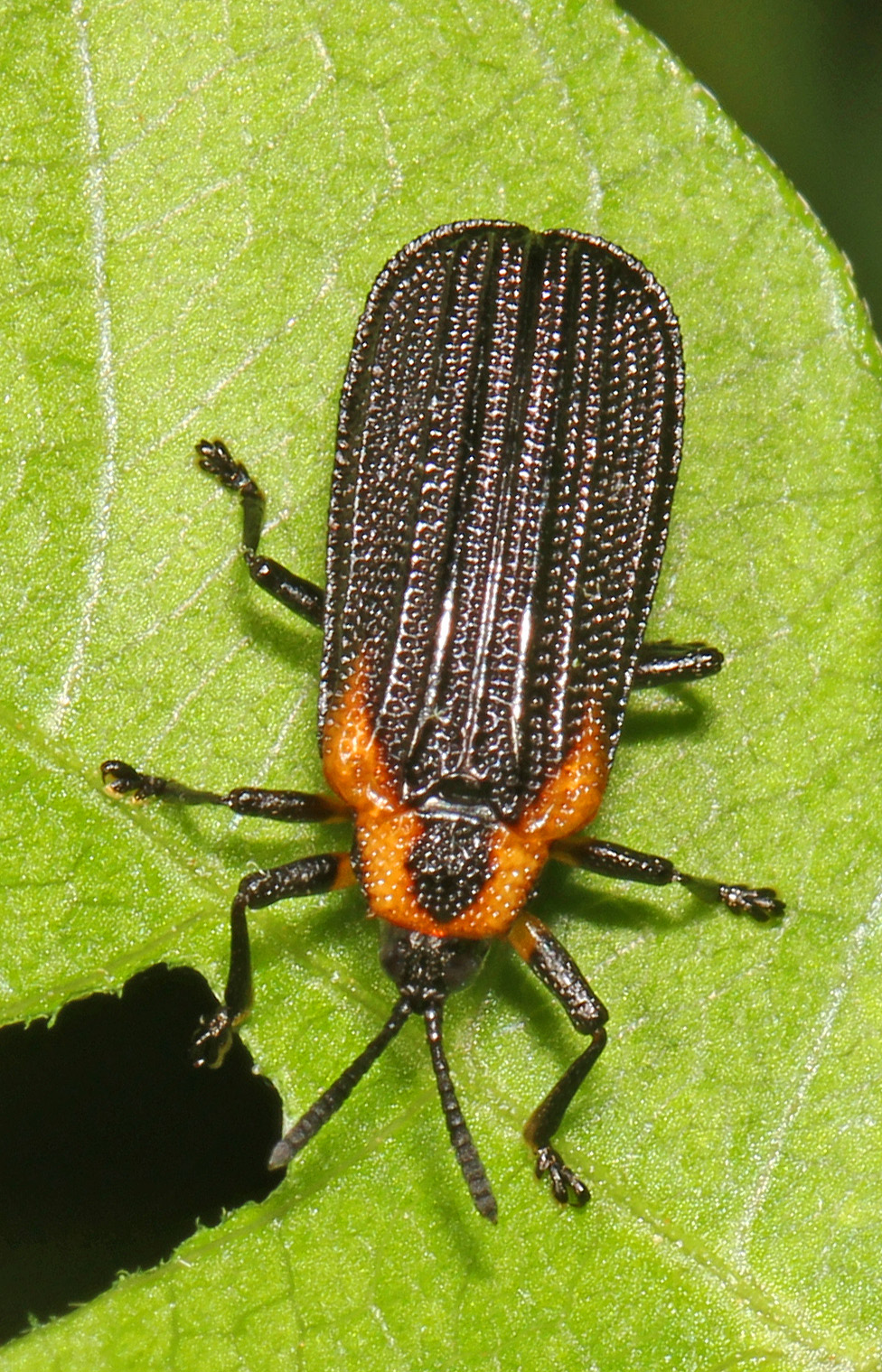

Scientific classification
- Kingdom: Animalia
- Phylum: Arthropoda
- Class: Insecta
- Order: Coleoptera
- Suborder: Polyphaga
- Infraorder: Cucujiformia
- Family: Chrysomelidae
- Genus: Odontota
- Species: O. scapularis

Binomial name
- Odontota scapularis (Olivier, 1808)

Synonyms
- Hispa scapularis Olivier, 1808; Hispa lateralis Say, 1823

= Odontota scapularis =

Species of beetle

Odontota scapularis, the orange-shouldered leaf miner, is a species of leaf beetle in the family Chrysomelidae. It is found in North America, where it has been recorded from Canada (Ontario), United States (Alabama, Arkansas, Connecticut, District of Columbia, Florida, Georgia, Illinois, Indiana, Kansas, Kentucky, Louisiana, Maryland, Massachusetts, Michigan, Minnesota, Mississippi, Missouri, New Jersey, New York, North Carolina, Ohio, Oklahoma, Pennsylvania, Rhode Island, South Carolina, Tennessee, Texas, Virginia, West Virginia, Wisconsin).

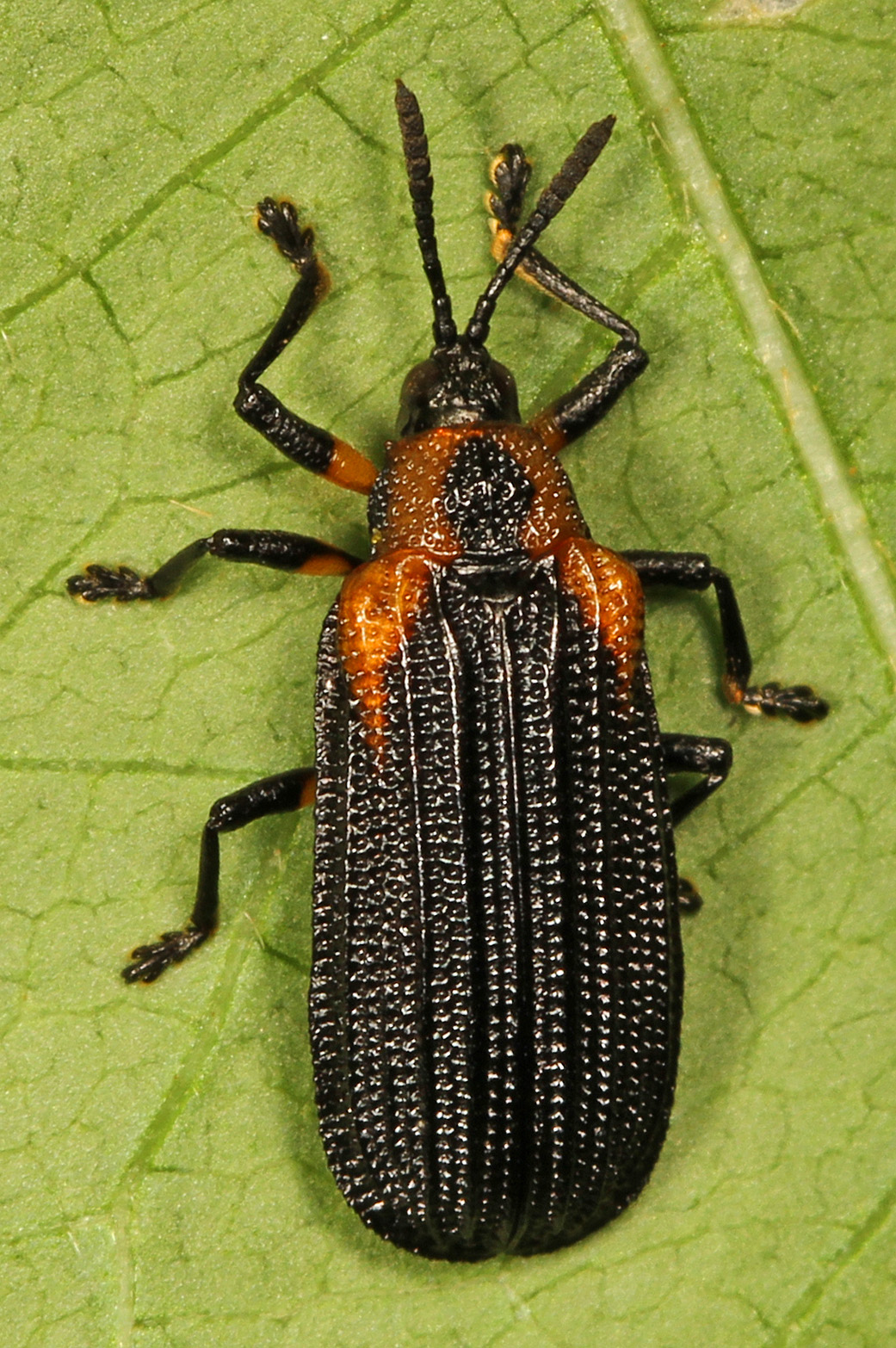
Orange-shouldered leaf miner, Odontota scapularis

== Biology ==
They have been recorded feeding on Apios americana.
