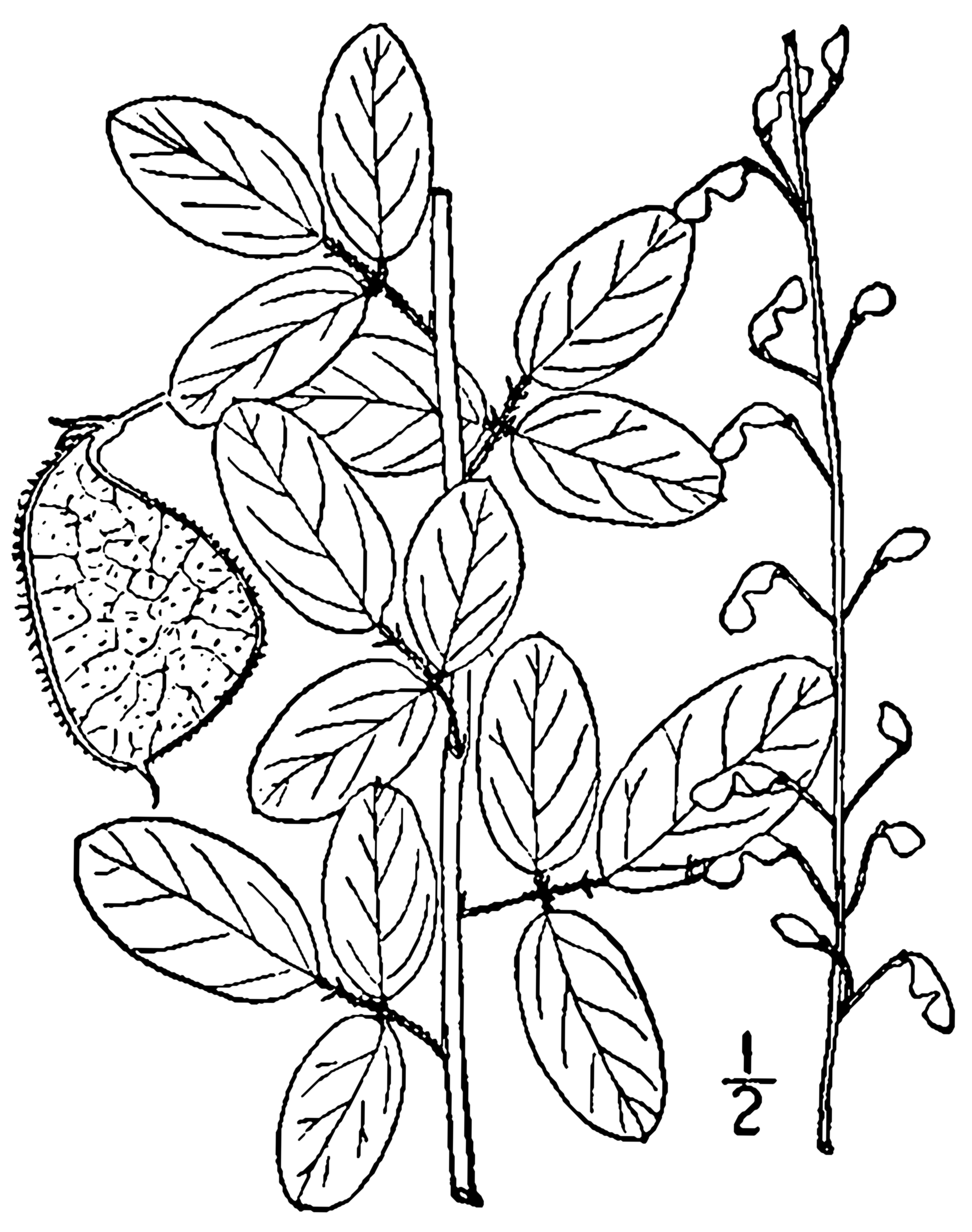

Scientific classification
- Kingdom: Plantae
- Clade: Tracheophytes
- Clade: Angiosperms
- Clade: Eudicots
- Clade: Rosids
- Order: Fabales
- Family: Fabaceae
- Subfamily: Faboideae
- Genus: Desmodium
- Species: D. obtusum

Binomial name
- Desmodium obtusum (Muhl. ex Willd.) DC.

= Desmodium obtusum =

Species of plant

Desmodium obtusum, commonly known as stiff tick-trefoil, is a member of the legume family native to the eastern United States.

== Description ==
Desmodium obtusum is an erect, perennial herb reaching 0.5–1.2 meters in height, with stems densely covered in uncinate (hooked) pubescence. Leaves are trifoliolate, with terminal leaflets ranging from oblong to ovate or elliptic, typically 2–3.5 (occasionally up to 4.5) cm long and about 1.8–2.2 times longer than wide. The upper leaflet surface is short-puberulent to nearly glabrous, while the lower surface is more densely pubescent and prominently reticulate-veined. Stipules are lance-attenuate to ovate-lanceolate, 2–6 mm long, and quickly deciduous; stipels are persistent. Inflorescences are usually terminal panicles, short-pubescent to pilose, bearing purplish papilionaceous flowers with petals approximately 4–6 mm long. Stamens are diadelphous (9 fused + 1 free). The fruit is a stipitate loment consisting of 1–4 weakly obovate to suborbicular segments, each 3–5 mm long and about 2.5 mm wide, slightly convex on the upper suture and broadly rounded below, densely covered with uncinate pubescence on both surfaces. The stipe is 1.5–3.5 mm long, exceeding the calyx tube but shorter than the calyx lobes and stamen remnants.

== Distribution and habitat ==
Desmodium obtusum is found in Massachusetts west to southern Michigan and south to the Florida Panhandle and Texas. It grows in fields, longleaf pine sandhills and dry pine flatwoods, other dry pine woodlands, woodland borders, and disturbed areas.

== Ecology ==
Desmodium obtusum flowers from June through September and fruits from August to October.

It thrives in frequently burned habitats, and benefits from prescribed fire occurring in the spring.
