= Desmodium tenuifolium =

Scientific classification
- Kingdom: Plantae
- Clade: Tracheophytes
- Clade: Angiosperms
- Clade: Eudicots
- Clade: Rosids
- Order: Fabales
- Family: Fabaceae
- Subfamily: Faboideae
- Genus: Desmodium
- Species: D. tenuifolium

Binomial name
- Desmodium tenuifolium Torr. & A. Gray

Species of plant

Desmodium tenuifolium, the slimleaf tick-trefoil, is a perennial forb in the legume family endemic to the southeastern United States.

== Description ==
Desmodium tenuifolium is an erect, perennial herb growing 0.5–1.2 meters tall, with stems densely but subtly covered in uncinate puberulence and scattered uncinate pubescence, often becoming glabrate near the base. Leaves are trifoliolate, with terminal leaflets extremely narrow and linear, typically 4–8 cm long and only 3–8 mm wide, often 8–15 times longer than wide. The upper leaflet surface is glabrous to minutely puberulent, while the lower surface is sparsely short-pubescent, especially along the veins, with clearly reticulate venation. Stipules are linear to linear-subulate, 2–5 mm long and caducous; stipels are persistent. The inflorescence is usually a terminal panicle with pedicels 4–10 mm long. The calyx is densely puberulent with sparse short pubescence; petals are pinkish to purplish, measuring 4–5 mm in length. Stamens are diadelphous. The fruit is a stipitate loment composed of 1–3 suborbicular to subelliptic segments, each 3.5–5 mm long and 2.5–3.5 mm wide. Each segment is bowed outward along the upper suture and densely uncinulate-puberulent on both surfaces and along the sutures. The stipe is 1–2 mm long, slightly shorter than to just exceeding the calyx, but shorter than the staminal remnants.

== Distribution and habitat ==
Desmodium tenuifolium is found from southeastern Virginia south to central peninsular Florida and west to Louisiana. It grows in pine savannas and wet pine flatwoods that are frequently burned. It requires fire to maintain its presence, and tends to disappear with fire exclusion.
