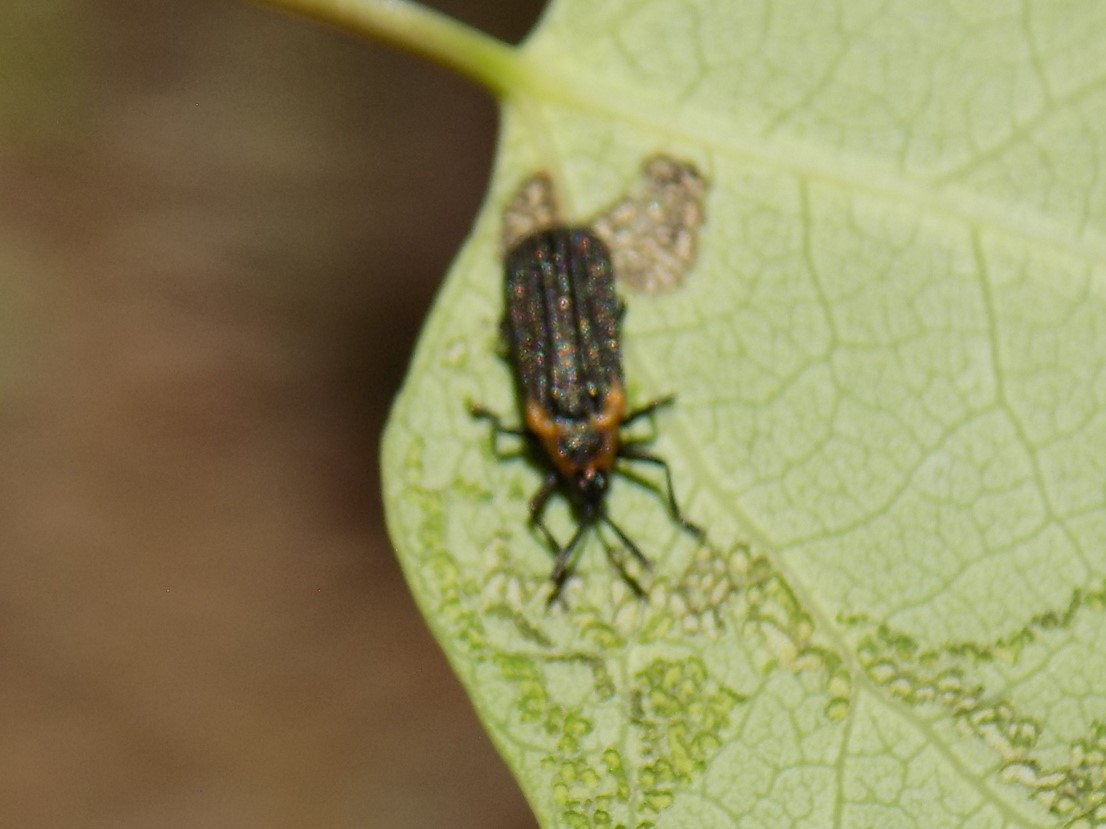

Scientific classification
- Kingdom: Animalia
- Phylum: Arthropoda
- Class: Insecta
- Order: Coleoptera
- Suborder: Polyphaga
- Infraorder: Cucujiformia
- Family: Chrysomelidae
- Genus: Odontota
- Species: O. arizonica

Binomial name
- Odontota arizonica (Uhmann, 1938)

Synonyms
- Xenochalepus arizonicus Uhmann, 1938

= Odontota arizonica =

Species of beetle

Odontota arizonica is a species of leaf beetle in the family Chrysomelidae. It is found in Central America and North America, where it has been recorded from Mexico (Baja California) and the United States (Arizona, New Mexico).

== Biology ==
The foodplant is unknown, but adults have been collected on Glycine max, Quercus species (including Quercus devia), Sophora japonica, Zinnia species and Amorpha fruticosa.
