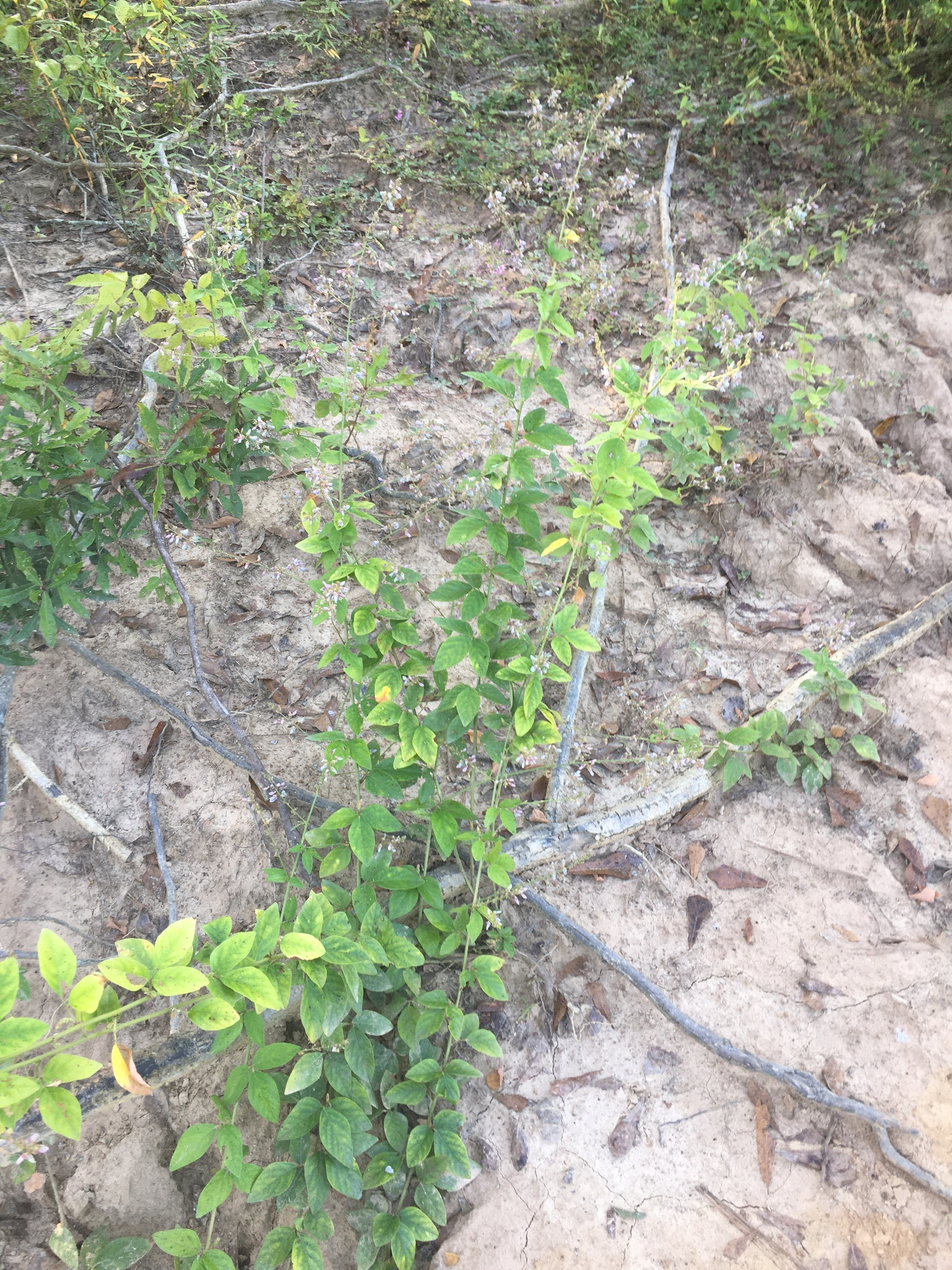

Scientific classification
- Kingdom: Plantae
- Clade: Tracheophytes
- Clade: Angiosperms
- Clade: Eudicots
- Clade: Rosids
- Order: Fabales
- Family: Fabaceae
- Subfamily: Faboideae
- Genus: Desmodium
- Species: D. viridiflorum

Binomial name
- Desmodium viridiflorum (L.) DC.

= Desmodium viridiflorum =

Species of flowering plant

Desmodium viridiflorum is a perennial forb in the family Fabaceae native to the United States.

== Description ==
Desmodium viridiflorum is an erect, perennial herb ranging from 0.8 to 2 meters in height, with stems that are sparsely to densely puberulent and uncinulate-pubescent, occasionally becoming pilose. Leaves are typically trifoliolate, with terminal leaflets rhombic to deltoid in shape, measuring 3.5–11 cm long and about two-thirds as wide. The upper surface of the leaflets is glabrate to moderately pilose, while the lower surface is densely velvety-tomentose. Stipules are lance-ovate, acuminate, and 3–7 mm long; stipels are persistent. The inflorescence is a terminal panicle, densely puberulent and uncinulate-pubescent, with pedicels 2.5–8 mm long. The calyx is sparsely to densely short-pubescent. Flowers are papilionaceous with pinkish to rose-colored petals, 5–9 mm long and 3.5–5 mm wide, straight or slightly angled at the apex and bluntly angular to rounded at the base. The fruit is a stipitate loment composed of 1–several segments, each moderately to densely uncinulate-pubescent on both surfaces and along the sutures. The stipe is 2.5–6 mm long, significantly longer than the calyx tube but shorter than the staminal remnants.

== Distribution and habitat ==
Desmodium viridiflorum is found from New Jersey and Delaware south to central peninsular Florida, west to Texas, and inland to western Virginia, North Carolina, northern Tennessee, and Arkansas. It grows in oak and pine woodlands, woodland borders, and disturbed areas.

== Ecology ==
Desmodium viridiflorum has a relatively high nitrogen fixation rate and acetylene reduction rate among legumes. It flowers from June through September and fruits from August to October.
