= Desmodium fernaldii =

Conservation status
- Apparently Secure (NatureServe)

Scientific classification
- Kingdom: Plantae
- Clade: Tracheophytes
- Clade: Angiosperms
- Clade: Eudicots
- Clade: Rosids
- Order: Fabales
- Family: Fabaceae
- Subfamily: Faboideae
- Genus: Desmodium
- Species: D. fernaldii

Binomial name
- Desmodium fernaldii B.G.Schub.

Species of flowering plant

Desmodium fernaldii is a species of flowering plant in the family Fabaceae. It is native to the southeastern United States.

== Description ==
Desmodium fernaldii is a herbaceous perennial plant. It possesses alternate pinnately shaped leaves and purple flowers.

== Taxonomy ==
Desmodium fernaldii was first described by the American botanist Bernice Schubert in 1950. The specific name fernaldii honors American botanist Merritt Lyndon Fernald "whose intensive work on the flora of [Virginia] has clarified many floristic problems of long standing".

Desmodium fernaldii is a member of the Desmodium paniculatum complex, a group of closely related taxa that also includes Desmodium paniculatum sensu stricto, Desmodium glabellum, and Desmodium perplexum. Alternatively, some botanists lump the taxa into a single polymorphic species, Desmodium paniculatum sensu lato, in which case Desmodium fernaldii becomes a variety of Desmodium paniculatum.

== Distribution and habitat ==
Desmodium fernaldii is native to the southeastern United States. It is most commonly found in sandhills and dry flatwood habitat types. D. fernaldii has shown preference for partial shade to shade, and dry soils.

== Bibliography ==
- Schubert, Bernice G. (June 1950). "Desmodium: Preliminary Studies—III". Rhodora. 52 (618): 135–155.
- Thomas, Justin R. (2020). "Desmodium glabellum and D. perplexum (Fabaceae): a morphological reevaluation" (PDF). Missouriensis. 38. Missouri Native Plant Society: 29–50.
