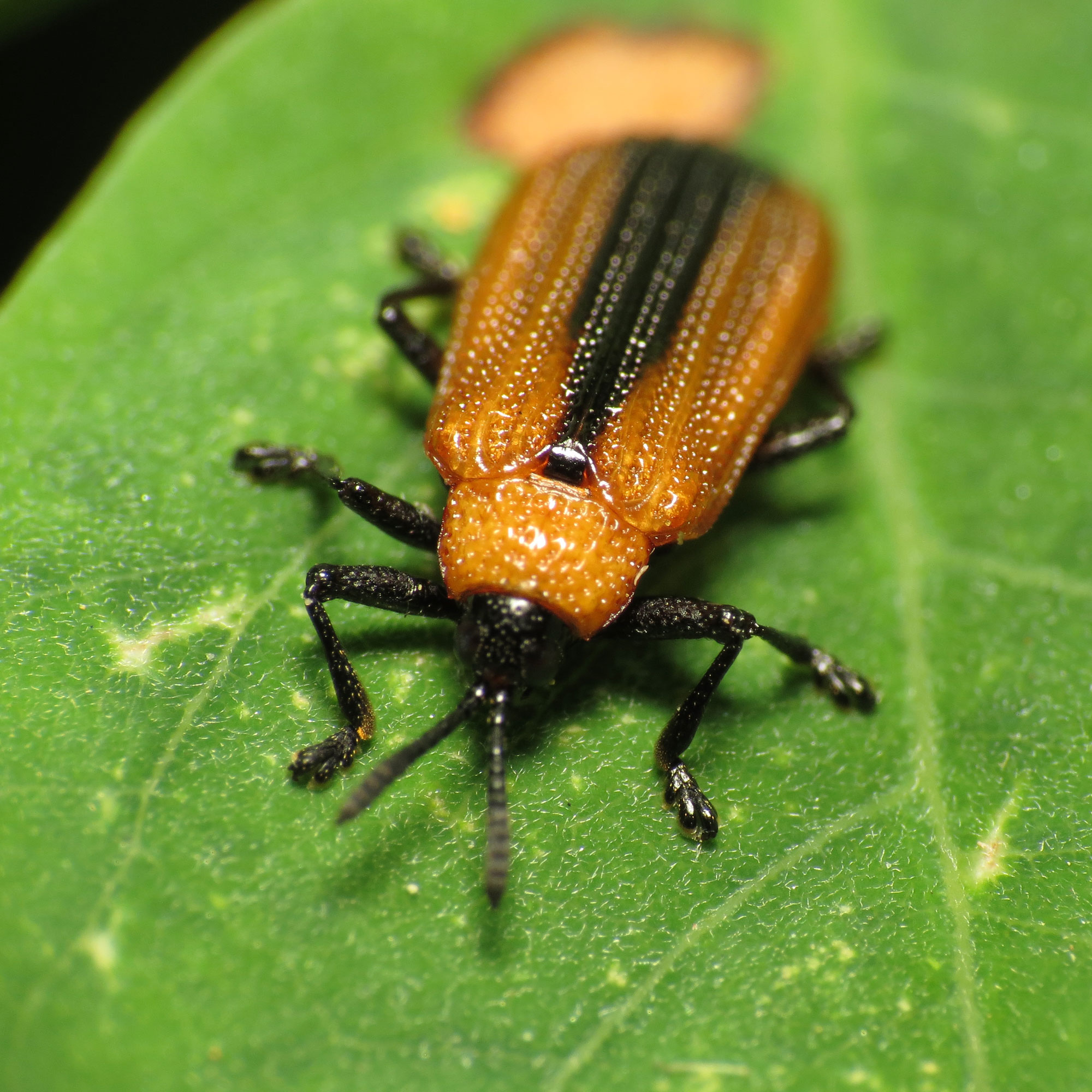

Scientific classification
- Kingdom: Animalia
- Phylum: Arthropoda
- Class: Insecta
- Order: Coleoptera
- Suborder: Polyphaga
- Infraorder: Cucujiformia
- Family: Chrysomelidae
- Genus: Odontota
- Species: O. dorsalis

Binomial name
- Odontota dorsalis (Thunberg, 1805)

Synonyms
- Chalepus dorsalis Thunberg, 1805; Hispa scutellaris Olivier, 1808; Odontota harrisi Crotch, 1873

= Odontota dorsalis =

Species of beetle

Odontota dorsalis, the locust leaf miner, is a species of leaf beetle in the family Chrysomelidae. It is found in North America, where it has been recorded from Canada (Manitoba, New Brunswick, Ontario, Quebec) and the United States (Alabama, Arkansas, Connecticut, Delaware, District of Columbia, Florida, Georgia, Idaho, Illinois, Indiana, Kansas, Kentucky, Louisiana, Maine, Maryland, Massachusetts, Michigan, Minnesota, Mississippi, Missouri, Nebraska, New Hampshire, New Jersey, New York, North Carolina, Ohio, Oklahoma, Pennsylvania, Rhode Island, South Carolina, Tennessee, Virginia, West Virginia, Wisconsin).

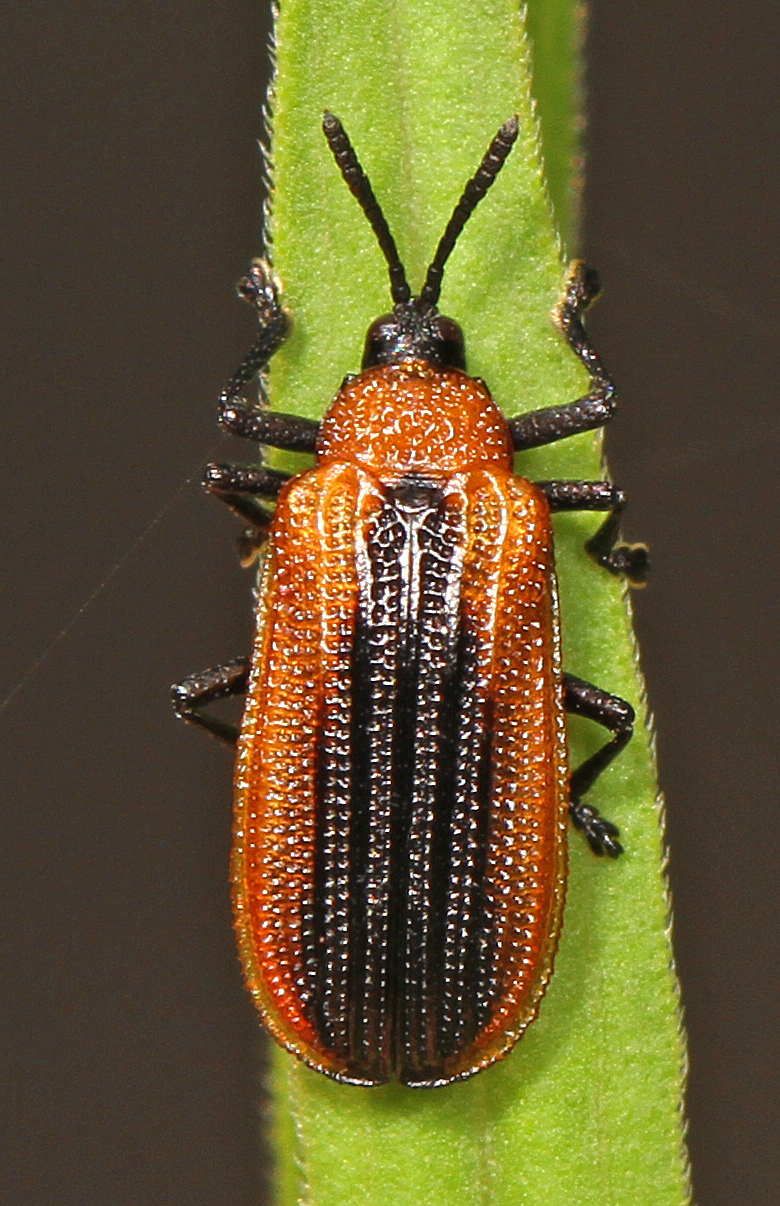
Locust leaf miner, Odontota dorsalis

== Biology ==
They have been recorded feeding on Robinia pseudoacacia, Robinia hispida, Sophora japonica, Acacia species, Amorpha fruticosa, Arachis hypogaea, Falcata comosa, Cercis canadensis, Cladrastis lutea, Desmodium species, Pueraria lobata, Gleditsia triacanthos, Laburnum anagyroides, Phaseolus lunatus, Phaseolus vulgaris and Glycine max.
