= Desmodium strictum =

Scientific classification
- Kingdom: Plantae
- Clade: Tracheophytes
- Clade: Angiosperms
- Clade: Eudicots
- Clade: Rosids
- Order: Fabales
- Family: Fabaceae
- Subfamily: Faboideae
- Genus: Desmodium
- Species: D. strictum

Binomial name
- Desmodium strictum (Pursh) DC.

Species of plant

Desmodium strictum, the pineland tick-trefoil or the pinebarren tick-trefoil is a perennial forb in the legume family native to the eastern United States.

== Description ==
Desmodium strictum is an erect, perennial herb ranging from 0.5 to 1.2 meters tall, with stems sparsely to densely covered in uncinate (hooked) puberulence and short pubescence, often becoming nearly glabrous toward the base. Leaves are trifoliolate with terminal leaflets that are linear to narrowly oblong, typically 3–7 cm long and 6–10 times longer than wide. Leaf surfaces are mostly glabrate or minutely puberulent, with sparse short pubescence along the veins on the lower surface and a fine reticulate venation. Stipules are linear-subulate, 2–4 mm long and early deciduous; stipels are persistent. Inflorescences are typically terminal panicles, densely uncinate-puberulent, with pedicels (4) 6–11 mm long. Calyces are densely puberulent and sparsely short-pubescent; petals are purplish and 3–5 mm long. Stamens are diadelphous. Fruits are stipitate loments with 1–3 suborbicular to weakly obovate segments, each 4–6 mm long and 3–4 mm wide, with the upper suture slightly concave or indented. Segments are densely uncinate-puberulent on both surfaces and sutures. The stipe is 1–2 mm long, approximately equal to the calyx but shorter than the staminal remnants.

== Distribution and habitat ==
Desmodium strictum is found from southern New Jersey to southern Florida and west to western Louisiana. It grows in longleaf pine sandhills and other dry woodlands.

== Ecology ==
Desmodium strictum flowers July through August and fruits from August to October. It lacks a hard seed coat, and is therefore not capable of forming long-term persistent seed banks, readily germinating within one year after it is dispersed. It thrives in frequently burned habitats (1-2 year interval) and does best under winter and spring burn regiments.
