= Odontota notata =

Scientific classification
- Kingdom: Animalia
- Phylum: Arthropoda
- Class: Insecta
- Order: Coleoptera
- Suborder: Polyphaga
- Infraorder: Cucujiformia
- Family: Chrysomelidae
- Genus: Odontota
- Species: O. notata

Binomial name
- Odontota notata (Olivier, 1808)

Synonyms
- Hispa notata Olivier, 1808

Species of beetle

Odontota notata is a species of beetle of the family Chrysomelidae. It is found in the United States (Alabama, District of Columbia, Florida, Georgia, Mississippi, New Jersey, North Carolina, South Carolina, Pennsylvania, South Carolina, Virginia).

== Biology ==
They have been recorded feeding on Tephrosia virginiana.
