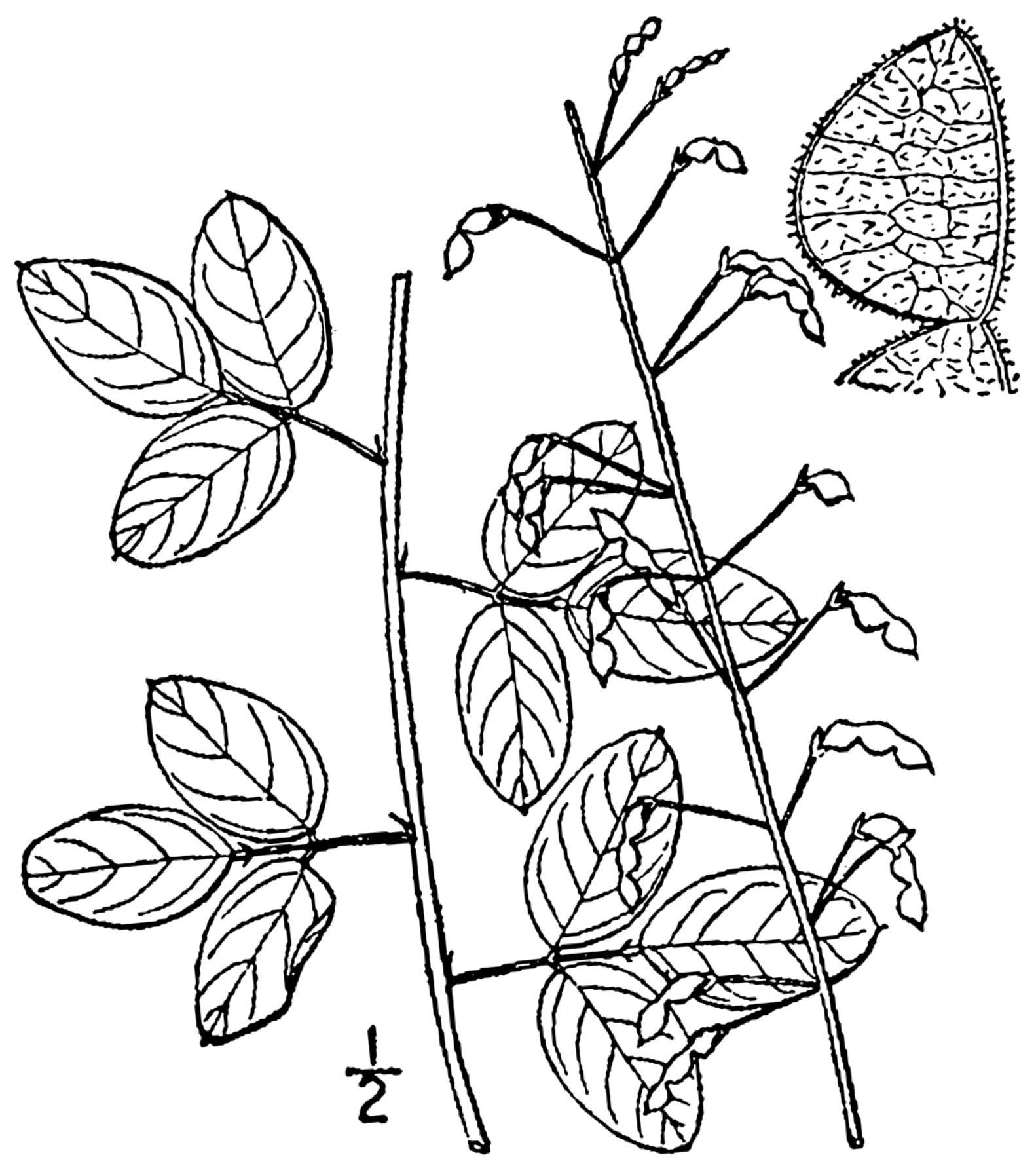

Scientific classification
- Kingdom: Plantae
- Clade: Tracheophytes
- Clade: Angiosperms
- Clade: Eudicots
- Clade: Rosids
- Order: Fabales
- Family: Fabaceae
- Subfamily: Faboideae
- Genus: Desmodium
- Species: D. marilandicum

Binomial name
- Desmodium marilandicum (L.) DC.

= Desmodium marilandicum =

Species of plant

Desmodium marilandicum, commonly known as Maryland ticktrefoil or the smooth small-leaved tick-trefoil perennial legume native to the eastern United States.

== Description ==
Desmodium marilandicum is an erect perennial plant, typically growing 60 to 150 cm tall. The stems are smooth or sparsely covered with fine, hooked or soft hairs, but never densely hairy. The leaves are compound, with terminal leaflets that are ovate to nearly round, or oblong to elliptic, measuring 1 to 2.5 cm (occasionally up to 5 cm) in length, and typically about 1.6 to 2.2 times as long as they are wide. Both sides of the leaflets range from smooth to moderately hairy, especially on the flower's calyx lobes. Leaves are arranged alternately along the stem, and the leaf margins are smooth (entire).

The plant produces blue to purple flowers with bilateral symmetry. Each flower has four or five petals, which are fused into a cup or tube, and are typically 4 to 6 mm long. The stamens number ten and are diadelphous (arranged in two groups).

The fruit is a dry loment, meaning it consists of 1 to 3 weakly obovate segments, each 3.5 to 5.5 mm long and 3 to 4 mm wide, that do not split open when ripe. The stipe is 1.5 to 2.5 mm long, roughly equal to or shorter than the calyx and usually shorter than the remaining stamens.

== Distribution and habitat ==
Desmodium marilandicum is distributed from Massachusetts west to Michigan and Missouri and south to the northern Florida panhandle and Texas. It grows in fields, along woodland borders, and in disturbed areas.
