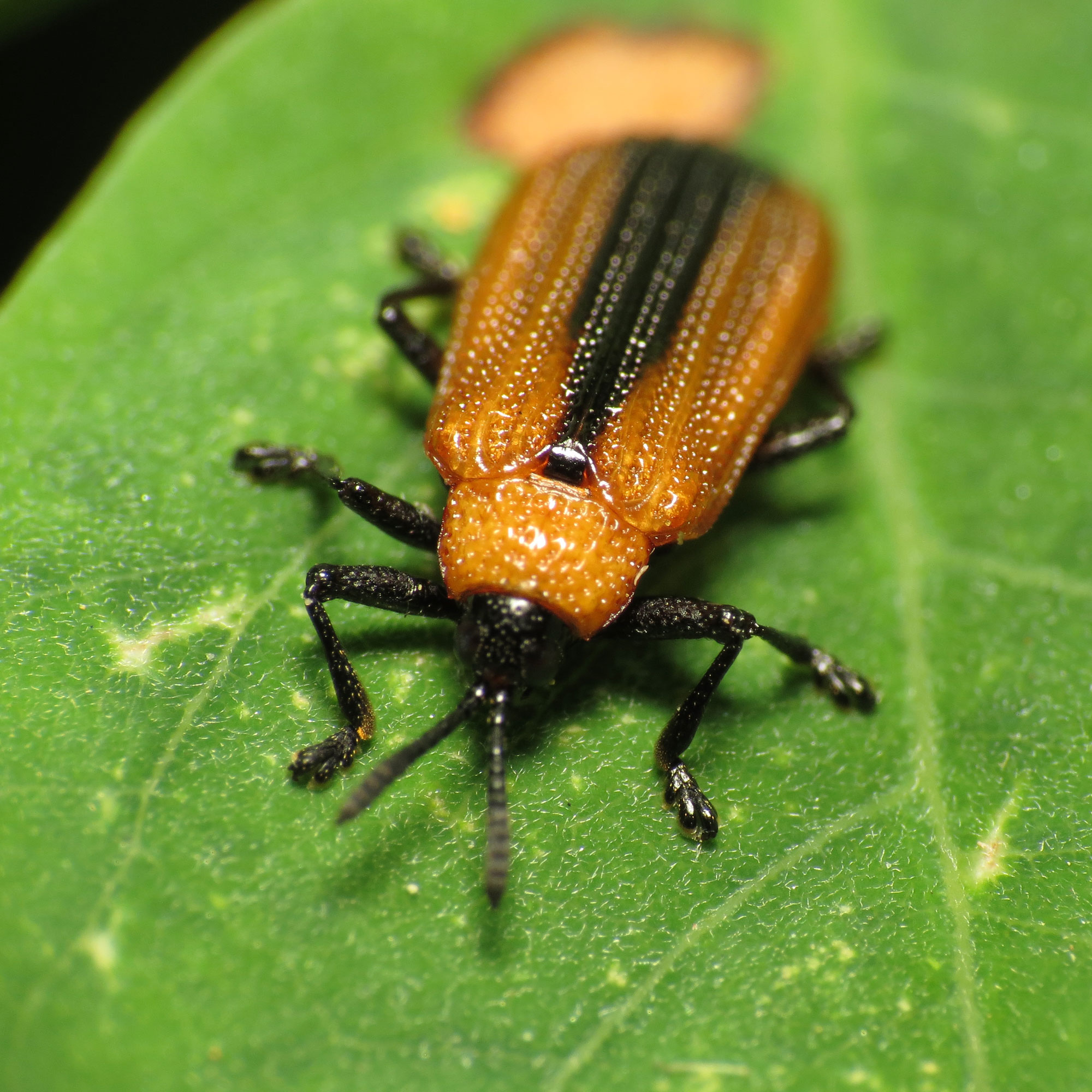
- Odontota dorsalis

Scientific classification
- Kingdom: Animalia
- Phylum: Arthropoda
- Clade: Pancrustacea
- Class: Insecta
- Order: Coleoptera
- Suborder: Polyphaga
- Infraorder: Cucujiformia
- Family: Chrysomelidae
- Tribe: Chalepini
- Genus: Odontota; Chevrolat in Dejean, 1836

= Odontota =

Genus of beetles

Odontota is a genus of tortoise beetles and hispines in the family Chrysomelidae. There are about nine described species in Odontota.

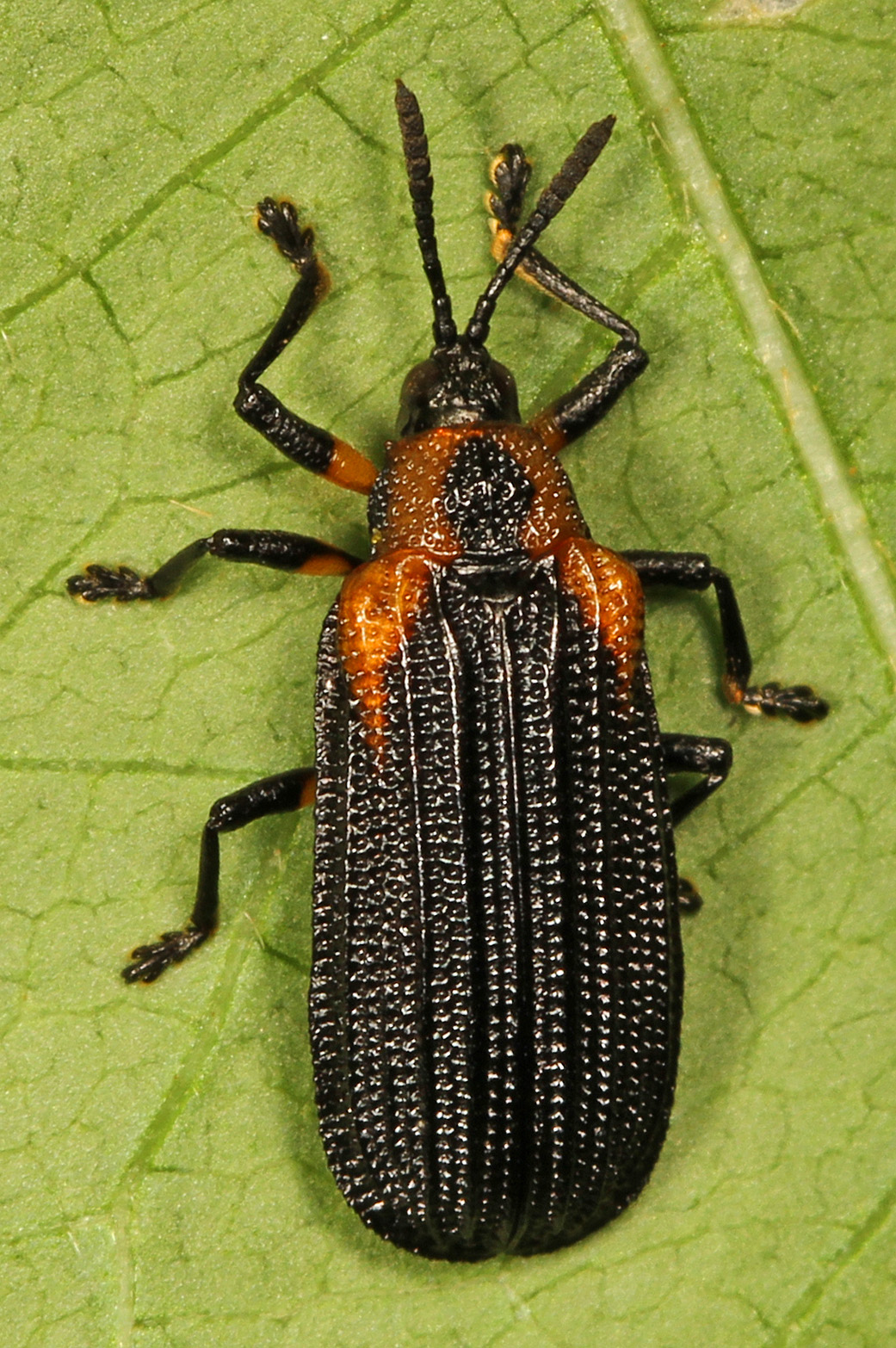
Odontota scapularis

== Species ==
These species belong to the genus Odontota:

- †Odontota americana Wickham, 1914 (type: Colorado, Florissant)
- Odontota arizonica (Uhmann, 1938)
- Odontota dorsalis (Thunberg, 1805) (locust leaf miner)
- Odontota floridana Butte, 1968
- Odontota horni J. Smith, 1885 (soybean leafminer)
- Odontota mundula (Sanderson, 1951)
- Odontota notata (Olivier, 1808)
- Odontota scapularis (Olivier, 1808) (orange-shouldered leaf miner)
- Odontota signaticollis (Baly, 1886)
