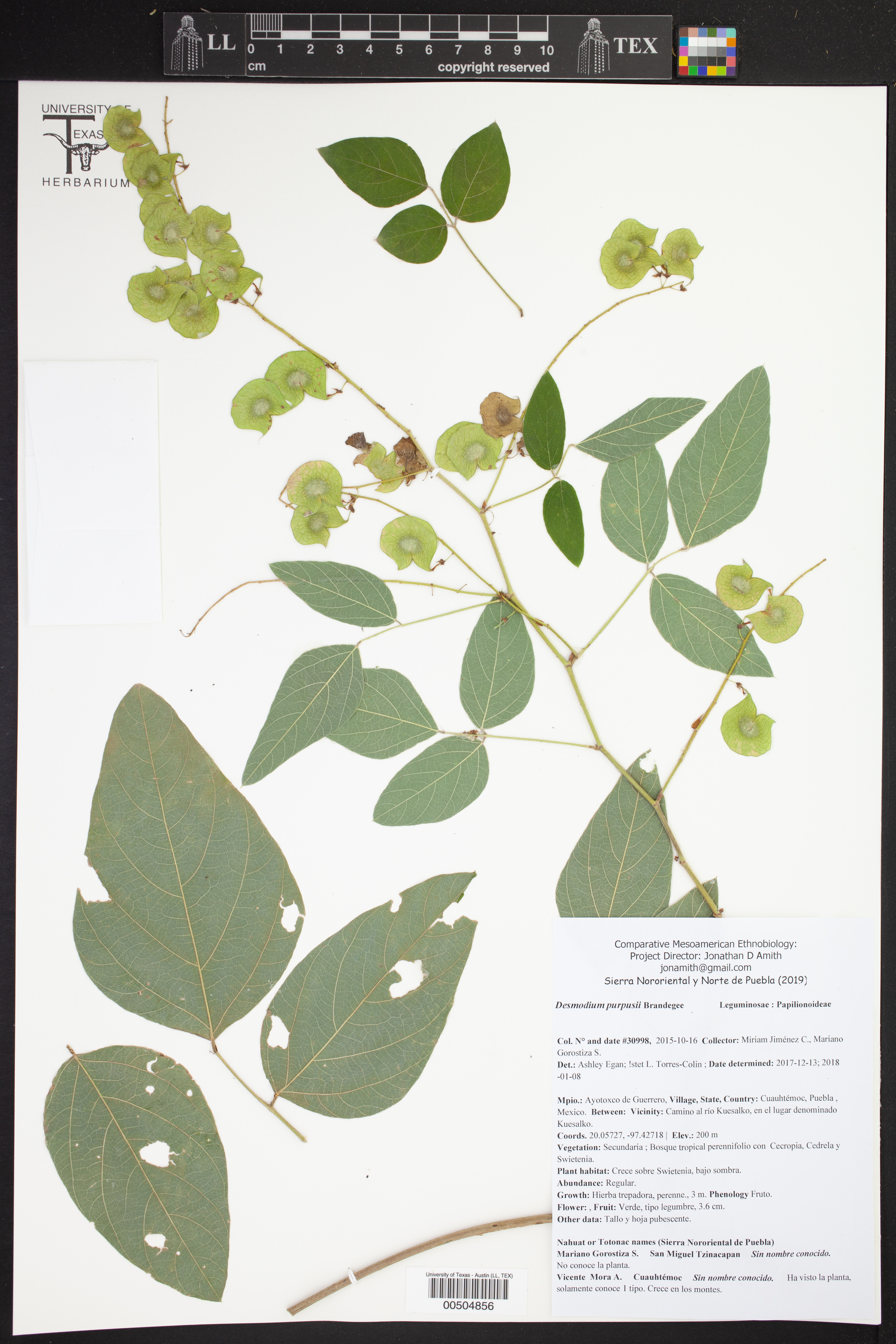

Scientific classification
- Kingdom: Plantae
- Clade: Tracheophytes
- Clade: Angiosperms
- Clade: Eudicots
- Clade: Rosids
- Order: Fabales
- Family: Fabaceae
- Subfamily: Faboideae
- Genus: Desmodium
- Species: D. purpusii

Binomial name
- Desmodium purpusii Brandegee (1914)

= Desmodium purpusii =

Species of plant

Desmodium purpusii is species of plant in the family Fabaceae. It is a climbing shrub whose native range extends between Southern Mexico and Peru.

== Description ==
The growth habit of Desmodium purpusii is that of a climbing shrub.
