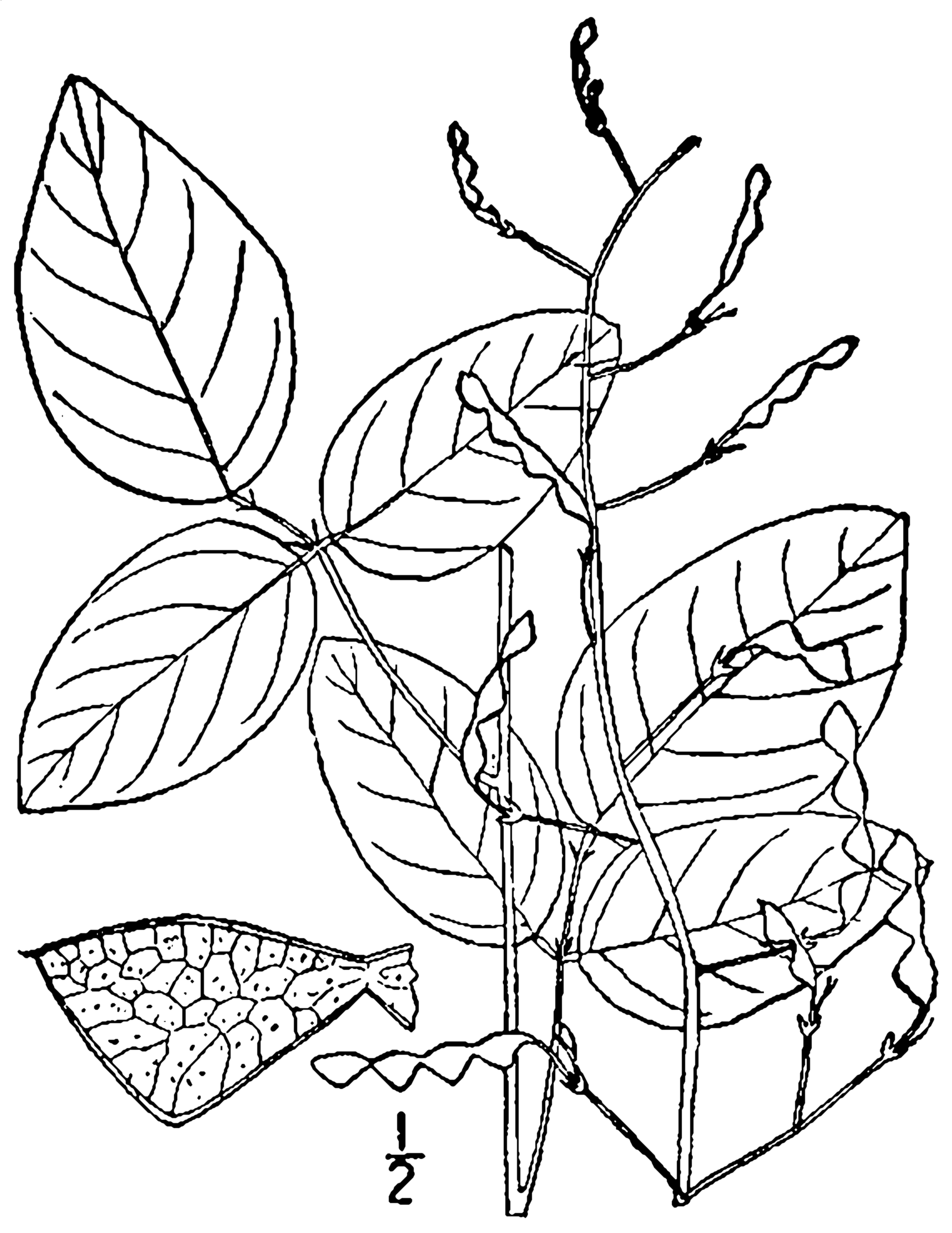

Scientific classification
- Kingdom: Plantae
- Clade: Tracheophytes
- Clade: Angiosperms
- Clade: Eudicots
- Clade: Rosids
- Order: Fabales
- Family: Fabaceae
- Subfamily: Faboideae
- Genus: Desmodium
- Species: D. laevigatum

Binomial name
- Desmodium laevigatum (Nutt.) DC.

= Desmodium laevigatum =

Species of plant

Desmodium laevigatum, the smooth tick-trefoil, is a perennial forb in the legume family native to east coast of the United States.

== Description ==
Desmodium laevigatum is an erect perennial species within the Desmodium genus, characterized by glabrous to sparsely uncinulate-puberulent stems reaching 0.5–1.2 meters in height. It bears terminal, ovate to elliptic-oblong leaflets (3–9 cm long), typically glabrous above and glaucous beneath, with sparse puberulence mainly along the veins. The stipules are lance-attenuate and early-shedding, while stipels are persistent. Its inflorescences are usually paniculate and moderately to densely covered with hooked hairs; flowers have pink to purple petals (8–10 mm), diadelphous stamens, and a densely puberulent calyx. The fruit is a stipitate loment composed of 2–5 subrhombic, densely hairy segments (5–8 mm long), with a stipe longer than the calyx tube but typically shorter than the staminal remnants. This species shares general Desmodium traits such as entire leaflets, papilionaceous flowers subtended by bracts, and indehiscent, segmented legumes.

== Distribution and habitat ==
Desmodium laevigatum is found from southern New York west to Indiana and Missouri and south to northern Florida, Panhandle Florida, and Texas. It grows in fields, dry oak and pine forests, woodland borders, and disturbed areas. Where it is found, it is relatively infrequent compared to other Desmodium species within the same habitat. D. laevigatum has been observed in areas that are frequently burned, but also those that are fire excluded.

== Ecology ==
Desmodium laevigatum is insect pollinated and is recorded to have been visited in northern Florida by Lasioglossum weemsi/leviense, Megachile mendica, and Megachile petulans.
