= Desmodium scorpiurus =

- Flowers are tiny
- Foliage is clover-like

Scientific classification
- Kingdom: Plantae
- Clade: Tracheophytes
- Clade: Angiosperms
- Clade: Eudicots
- Clade: Rosids
- Order: Fabales
- Family: Fabaceae
- Subfamily: Faboideae
- Genus: Desmodium
- Species: D. scorpiurus

Binomial name
- Desmodium scorpiurus (Sw.) Poir.

Synonyms
- List: Desmodium akoense Hayata; Desmodium arenarium Kunth; Desmodium cinereum Poepp. ex Griseb.; Desmodium multicaule DC.; Desmodium parviflorum M.Martens & Galeotti; Desmodium virgatum Desv.; Hedysarum ramosum Willd. ex Steud.; Hedysarum scorpiurus Sw.; Meibomia arenaria (Kunth) Kuntze; Meibomia martensii Kuntze; Meibomia multicaulis (DC.) Kuntze; Meibomia scorpiurus (Sw.) Kuntze; Nissoloides cylindrica M.E.Jones

Species of plant

Desmodium scorpiurus, the Samoan clover or scorpion ticktrefoil, is a species of flowering plant in the family Fabaceae. It is native to the New World tropics and subtropics, and it has been widely introduced to Africa, India, Malesia, Australia, and the islands of the Pacific as a livestock forage. A spreading prostrate perennial with stems about 50 cm (20 in) long, it is typically found in the seasonally dry tropics at elevations from 0 to 1,460 m (0 to 4,790 ft).
