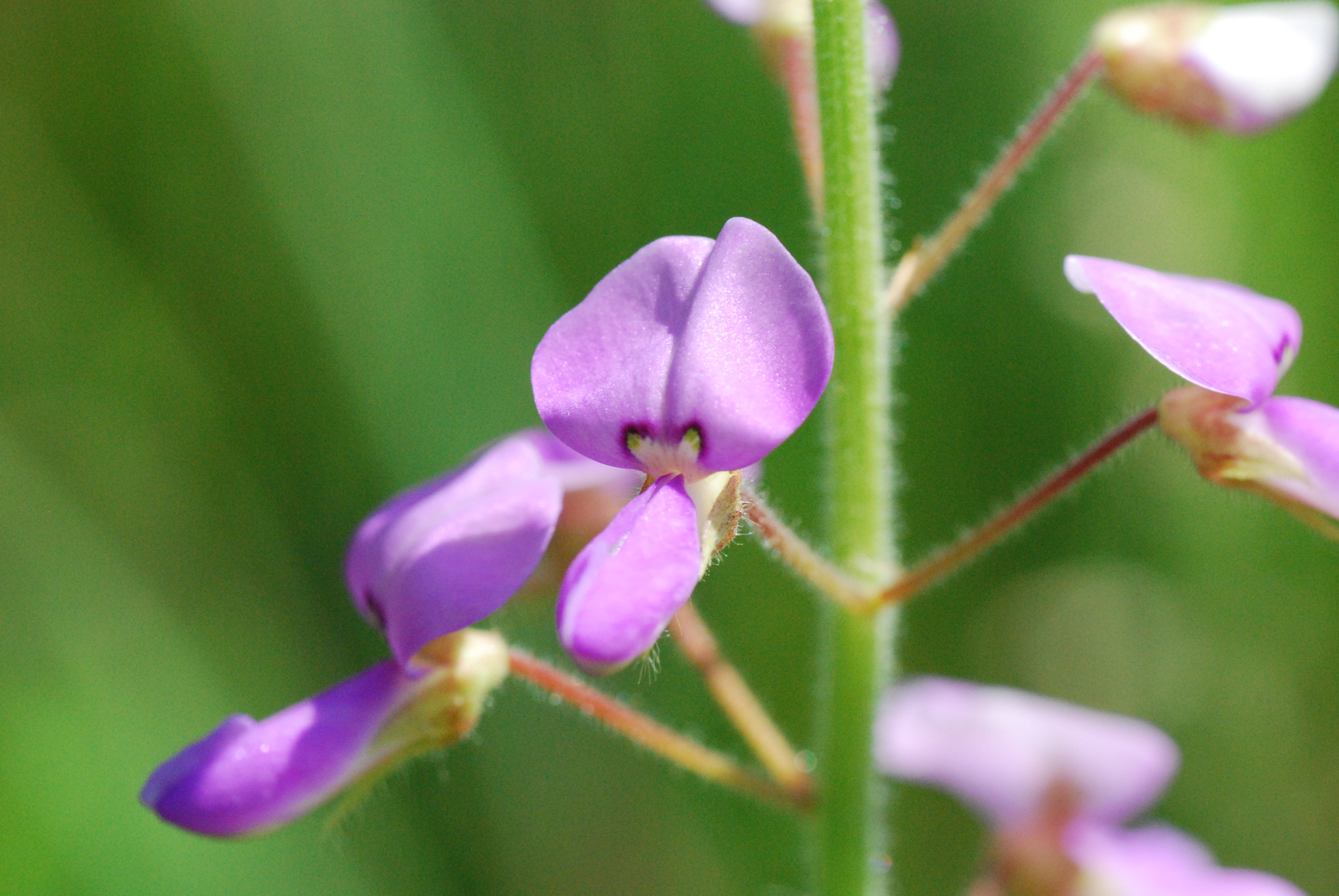

Scientific classification
- Kingdom: Plantae
- Clade: Tracheophytes
- Clade: Angiosperms
- Clade: Eudicots
- Clade: Rosids
- Order: Fabales
- Family: Fabaceae
- Subfamily: Faboideae
- Genus: Desmodium
- Species: D. illinoense

Binomial name
- Desmodium illinoense A.Gray

Synonyms
- Meibomia illinoensis (A. Gray) Kuntze

= Desmodium illinoense =

Species of legume

Desmodium illinoense, the Illinois ticktrefoil, is a flowering plant in the bean family (Fabaceae), native to the central United States and Ontario, Canada. Illinois ticktrefoil grows in sunny places, such as prairies and oak savannas of the Great Plains and Great Lakes regions.

== Description ==
Desmodium illinoense is a perennial herb with typically a simple stem reaching a height of 1.2 m (4 feet), with much of the shoot covered with hooked hairs which can cause the leaves to stick together. The leaves are trifoliate and grow up to 6.3 cm (2.5 inches) long. The leaflets are rounded with a blunt tip. The calyx lobes of the flowers are the same length or longer than the corolla tube. The inflorescence is terminal and most often unbranched. The flowers are white to pink with a few white spots near the center. Flowers bloom June to September.

The seed pods are broken into sections called loments, where the outer layer of the fruit is constricted between the seeds so that when the pod is ripe it can break easily into individual segments. These are covered with hooked hairs so that they can easily become attached to fur or clothing and be carried some distance before falling to the ground and germinating.

== Distribution and habitat ==
Desmodium illinoense mostly grows naturally in prairies of the midwestern states of the US. The center of its natural range is the states of Missouri, Illinois, and Iowa; The northern limit of its range includes Minnesota (south eastern part of the state from the Twin Cities area south) where it is found growing in full sun to part shade in sandy or gravelly soils of savannas, hillside prairies, and barrens. In Minnesota it is also found in openings of oak woods, on dunes, and in thickets; and is listed a threatened species where the few remaining naturally occurring populations are small.
