= Desmodium floridanum =

Scientific classification
- Kingdom: Plantae
- Clade: Tracheophytes
- Clade: Angiosperms
- Clade: Eudicots
- Clade: Rosids
- Order: Fabales
- Family: Fabaceae
- Subfamily: Faboideae
- Genus: Desmodium
- Species: D. floridanum

Binomial name
- Desmodium floridanum Chapm.

Species of plant

Desmodium floridanum, the Florida tick-trefoil, is a forb in the legume family native to the southeastern United States.

== Description ==
Desmodium floridanum is an erect perennial forb reaching up to 50 cm in height, characterized by mostly uncinate pubescence on the stems and leaves. The lower leaves are typically single-foliolate, while the upper are three-foliolate, with terminal leaflets ranging from rhombic to ovate, softly hairy beneath, and 4–9 cm long. The stipules and stipels are persistent and lance-shaped. Its inflorescences are racemose to paniculate and covered with fine hooked hairs. The flowers have purplish petals (6–7.5 mm long), diadelphous stamens, and a slightly bilabiate calyx also bearing hairs. The fruit is a legume made of 3–5 flat, deltoid segments, each 6–7 mm long, with hooked pubescence aiding in seed dispersal. This species shares general traits with other Desmodium members, such as trifoliate leaves, stipules, and segmented legumes, but is distinguished by its specific leaflet shape, persistent appendages, and floral morphology.

== Distribution and habitat ==
Desmodium floridanum is native to the southeast coastal plain from southeast South Carolina to southern Florida. It grows in dry sandy habitats, such as longleaf pine sandhills, that are fire dependent.
