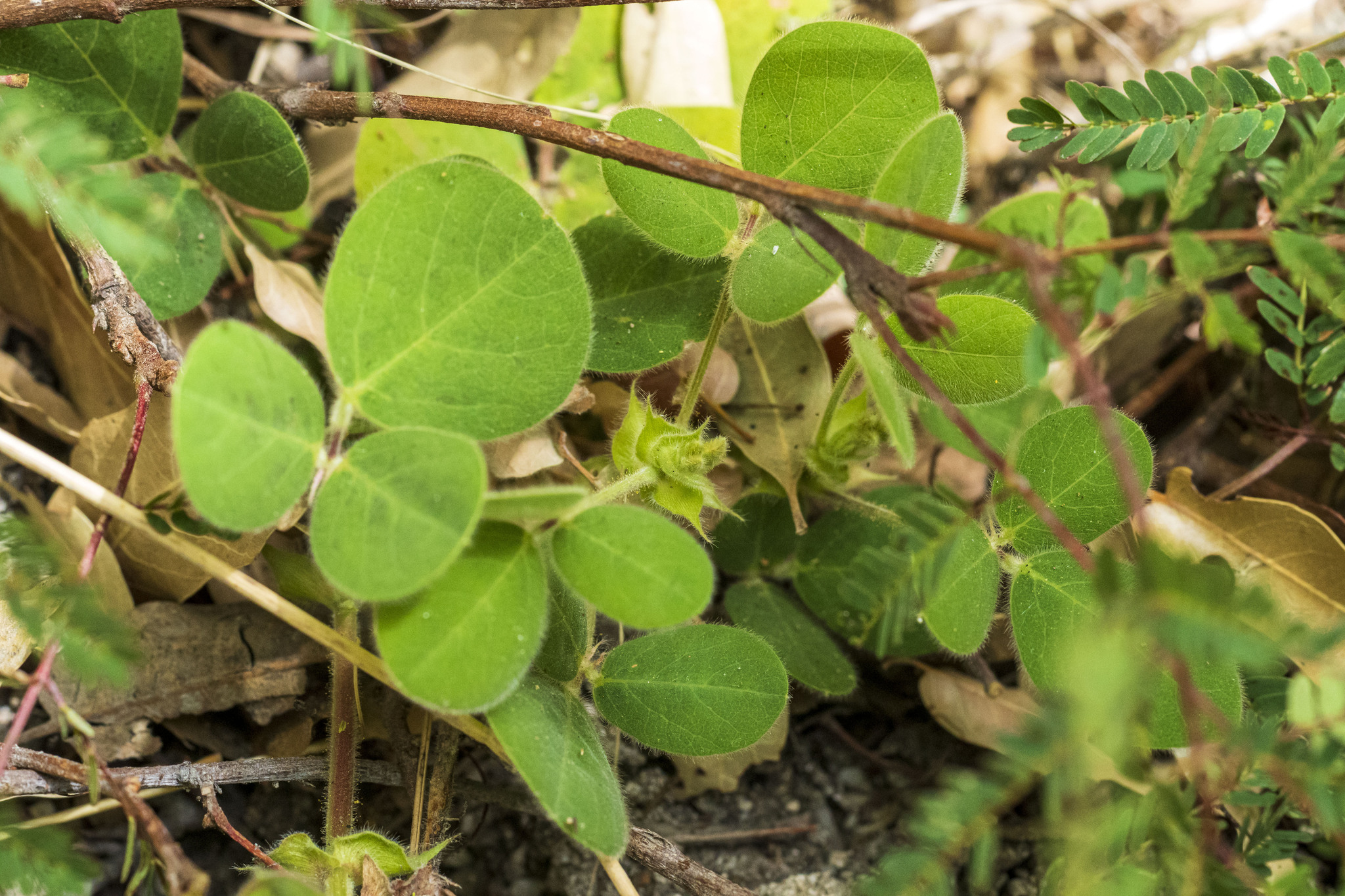

Scientific classification
- Kingdom: Plantae
- Clade: Tracheophytes
- Clade: Angiosperms
- Clade: Eudicots
- Clade: Rosids
- Order: Fabales
- Family: Fabaceae
- Subfamily: Faboideae
- Genus: Desmodium
- Species: D. prostratum

Binomial name
- Desmodium prostratum Brandegee

Synonyms
- Meibomia prostrata Schindl. 1926

= Desmodium prostratum =

Species of plant

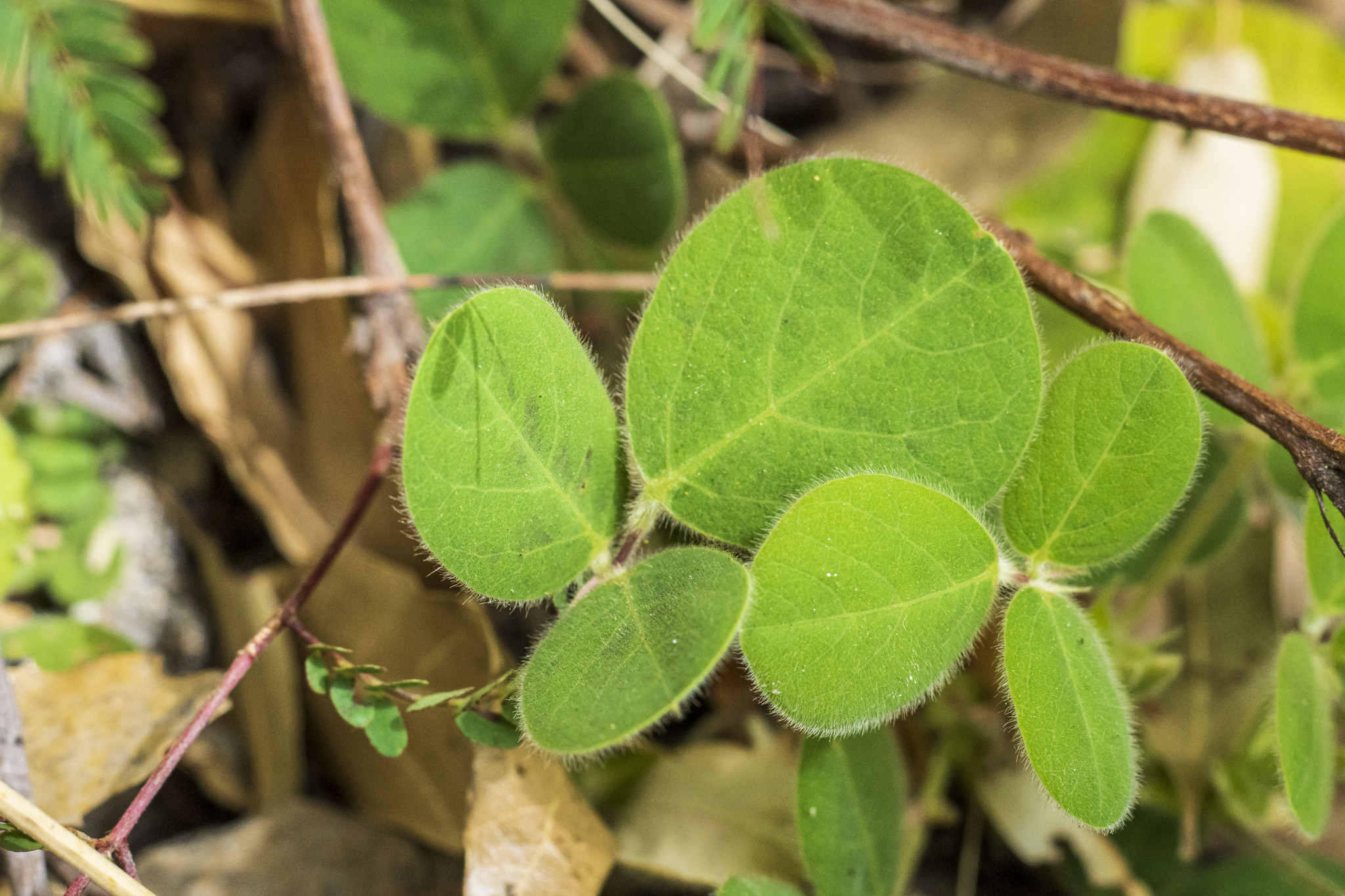
The characteristic orbicular leaflets of 3

Desmodium prostratum is a species of perennial herbaceous plant in the legume family commonly known as the Cape tick-trefoil. It is a very rare species endemic to the Sierra de la Laguna mountain range in Baja California Sur, Mexico, where it grows in stream banks, canyons, and mountains. It has prostrate stems of orbicular leaves divided into 3 leaflets, growing from a perennial root. The flowers are purple and bloom from September to November. Desmodium prostratum was first discovered and described by Townshend Stith Brandegee in 1891.
