= Bernice Giduz Schubert =

American botanist & scholar (1913–2000)

Bernice Giduz Schubert (October 6, 1913 – August 14, 2000) was an American botanist. Her academic career developed over 53 years as a professor and herbarium curator with Harvard University.

She made many collection trips in Mexico and the United States.

== Early life and education ==
Bernice Giduz Schubert was born in 1913, in Boston, Massachusetts and grew up in the Dorchester Community. She graduated from the Girls Latin School and earned an undergraduate degree at the Massachusetts College of Agriculture (1935), and graduate degrees at Radcliffe College (M. A. 1937, Ph.D. 1941).

== Career ==
Dr. Schubert began her professional life working at the Gray Herbarium at Radcliffe. While there, she served as assistant to Merritt Fernald in compiling his Gray's Manual of Botany (1951) and Edible Wild Plants of Eastern North America (1958). She continued to work at the Gray Herbarium from 1936- 1949, in a part-time position and then a full-time position.She was awarded a Guggenheim Fellowship in 1949 to work on African plants in Belgium.

Upon returning to America in 1952, Schubert worked for the United States Department of Agriculture, classifying Central American species of possible medical value. She became associate curator at Arnold Arboretum in 1962, where she was editor of the journal, taught undergraduate and graduate classes, and advised students. She retired from Harvard in 1984.

== Selected publications ==
The standard author abbreviation B.G.Schub. is used to indicate this person as the author when citing a botanical name.

- 1974. Begoniales. 4 pp.
- 1971. To New Species of Desmodium from Africa.
- 1955. Alkaloid Hunting. With John James Willaman

=== Books ===
- 1987. Flora of Veracruz: Dioscoreaceae.
- 1966. Aspects of Taxonomy in the Genus Dioscorea.
- 1961. Begoniaceae. with Lyman B. Smith.
- 1950. A New Begonia Argentinian. with Lyman B. Smith
- 1941. Review of the Argentinian species of the gender Begonia. with Lyman B. Smith.

== Honors ==
- 1949: Guggenheim Fellowship
