= Loment =

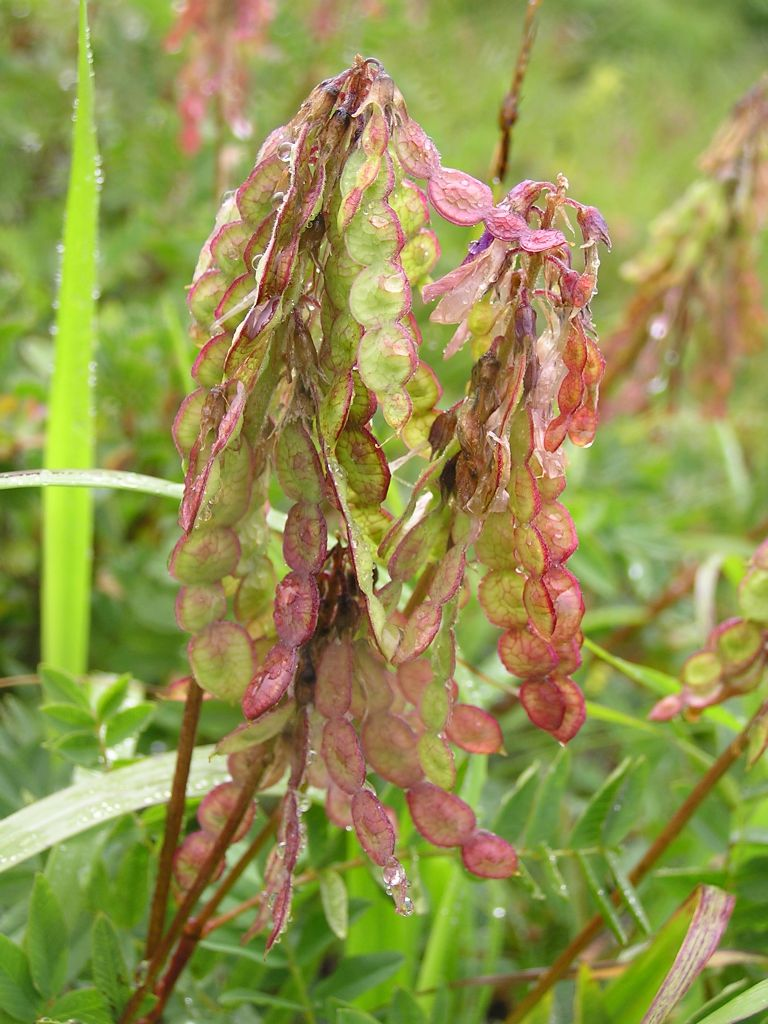
Loments of Hedysarum hedysaroides

A loment (or lomentum) is a part of certain legume plants. It is a type of indehiscent fruit that breaks apart at the constrictions occurring between segments, so that each segment contains only one seed. It is a type of schizocarp.

Tick trefoil (Desmodium) and sweet vetch (Hedysarum) are two genera that exhibit this fruit type, which is found particularly in the tribe Hedysareae of the family Fabaceae.
