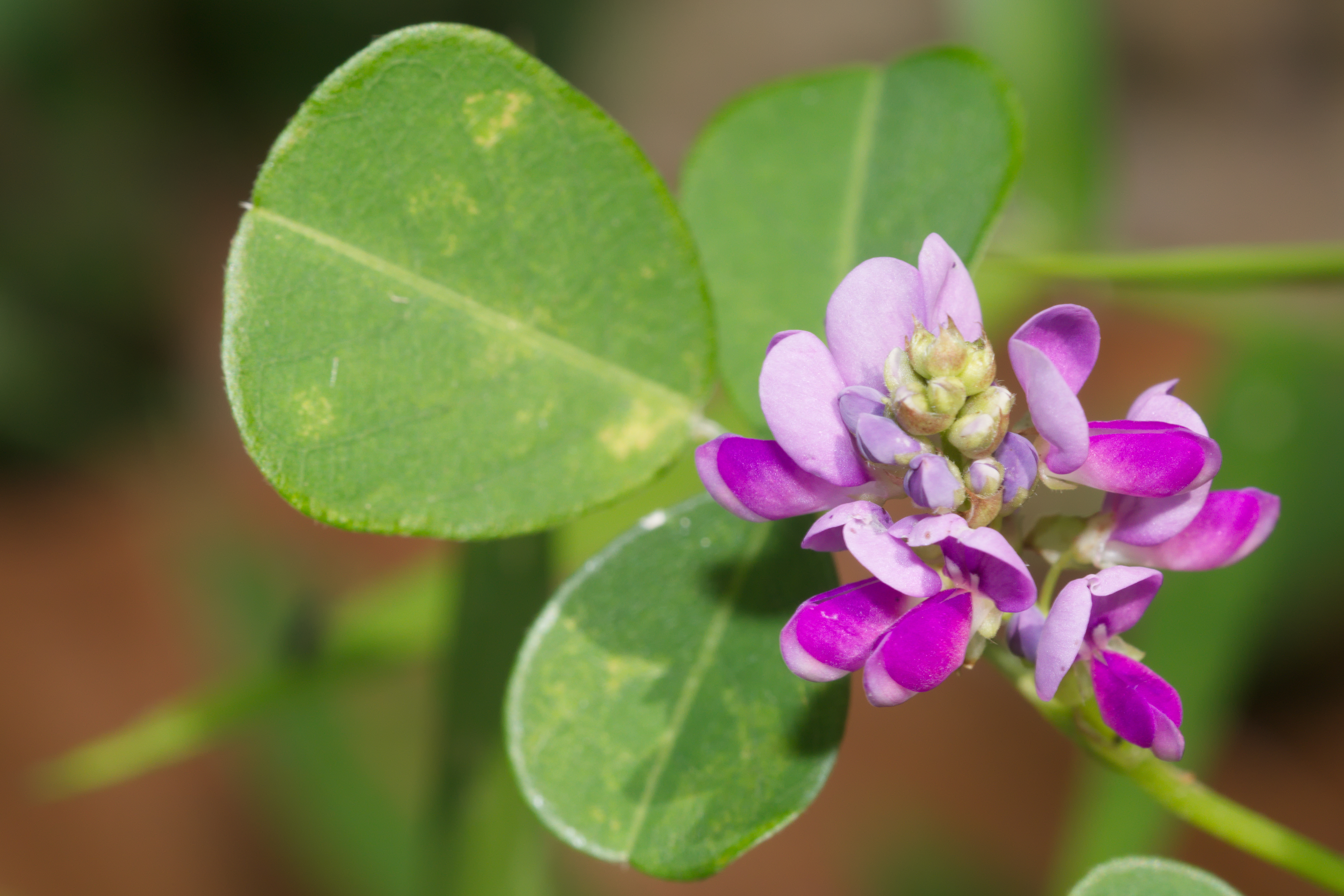
- Grona heterocarpos

Scientific classification
- Kingdom: Plantae
- Clade: Tracheophytes
- Clade: Angiosperms
- Clade: Eudicots
- Clade: Rosids
- Order: Fabales
- Family: Fabaceae
- Subfamily: Faboideae
- Tribe: Desmodieae
- Genus: Grona; Lour., 1790

Type species
- Grona repens Lour., 1790 ( = Grona heterocarpos (L.) H.Ohashi & K.Ohashi, 2018)

Diversity
- About 44 species

Synonyms
- Perrottetia DC., 1825

= Grona (plant) =

Genus of plants

Grona is a genus in the flowering plant family Fabaceae. Its native range is worldwide tropics and subtropics.

== Taxonomy ==
The genus is placed in subfamily Faboideae and tribe Desmodieae. It was previously included in its relative Desmodium.

There are about 50 species in the genus:

- Grona adscendens (Sw.) H.Ohashi & K.Ohashi – West Indies, Central and South America, introduced into Sri Lanka, India, Thailand, Malaysia, Philippines, Indonesia, New Guinea, Melanesia, and widely in tropical Africa, Madagascar
- Grona appressipila (B.G.Schub.) H.Ohashi & K.Ohashi – Tanzania
- Grona afra (E.Mey.) H.Ohashi & K.Ohashi – eastern and southern Africa
- Grona auricoma (Graham ex Benth.) H.Ohashi & K.Ohashi – India, Myanmar, Thailand, Cambodia, Laos, Vietnam, Indonesia (Java)
- Grona barbata (L.) H.Ohashi & K.Ohashi – Africa and tropical America
- Grona birmannica (Watt ex Prain) H.Ohashi & K.Ohashi – Myanmar
- Grona brachystachya (Graham ex Benth.) H.Ohashi & K.Ohashi – Southern India
- Grona brevipedicellata (W.Saisorn, Chantar. & Balslev) H.Ohashi & K.Ohashi – Thailand
- Grona brownii (Schindl.) H.Ohashi & K.Ohashi – Australia (Western Australia, Northern Territory, Queensland)
- Grona cordifolia (Harms) H.Ohashi & K.Ohashi – central Africa
- Grona ferruginea (Wall. ex Thwaites) H.Ohashi & K.Ohashi – Sri Lanka, India, Micronesia (Yap)
- Grona filiformis (Zoll. & Moritzi) H.Ohashi & K.Ohashi – Indonesia, New Guinea, Australia (Western Australia, Northern Territory, Queensland)
- Grona flagellaris (Benth.) H.Ohashi & K.Ohashi – Australia (Western Australia, Northern Territory)
- Grona fulvescens (B.G.Schub.) H.Ohashi & K.Ohashi – Congo
- Grona glareosa (Pedley) H.Ohashi & K.Ohashi – Australia (Western Australia, Northern Territory)
- Grona griffithiana (Benth.) H.Ohashi & K.Ohashi – India, Myanmar, Thailand, Laos, Vietnam, China (Guizhou, Sichuan, Yunnan)
- Grona hannii (Schindl.) H.Ohashi & K.Ohashi – Australia (Western Australia, Northern Territory, Queensland)
- Grona harmsii (Schindl.) H.Ohashi & K.Ohashi – Vietnam
- Grona helenae (Buscal. & Muschl.) H.Ohashi & K.Ohashi – Congo, Zambia, Zimbabwe
- Grona heterocarpos (L.) H. Ohashi & K. Ohashi – Sri Lanka, India, Nepal, Bhutan, Myanmar, Thailand, Malaysia, Cambodia, Laos, Vietnam, Indonesia, Philippines, China, Taiwan, and southern Japan, NE Australia, Pacific islands, Africa
- Grona heterophylla (Willd.) H.Ohashi & K.Ohashi – Sri Lanka, India, Nepal, Myanmar, Thailand, Cambodia, Laos, Vietnam, S & SE China, Taiwan, Japan (Ryukyus, Ogasawara), Pacific islands, Philippines, Indonesia, New Guinea, Madagascar (rare), introduced to Australia, New Caledonia
- Grona hirta (Guill. & Perr.) H.Ohashi & K.Ohashi – Tropical Africa, Madagascar
- Grona jucunda (Thwaites) H.Ohashi & K.Ohashi – Sri Lanka
- Grona juruenensis (Hoehne) H.Ohashi & K.Ohashi – Brazil
- Grona laosensis H.Ohashi, K.Ohashi & Tagane – Laos
- Grona muelleri (Benth.) H.Ohashi & K.Ohashi – Australia (Western Australia, Northern Territory, Queensland)
- Grona nemorosa (F.Muell. ex Benth.) H.Ohashi & K.Ohashi – New Guinea, Australia (Queensland, New South Wales)
- Grona orinocensis (DC.) H.Ohashi & K.Ohashi – Venezuela
- Grona pullenii (Pedley) H.Ohashi & K.Ohashi – Indonesia (Lesser Sunda Islands) and Australia (Western Australia, Northern Territory, Queensland)
- Grona pycnotricha (Pedley) H.Ohashi & K.Ohashi – Australia (Western Australia, Northern Territory)
- Grona ramosissima (G.Don) H.Ohashi & K.Ohashi – Uganda, Kenya, Tanganyika, Zambia, Madagascar, Mascarene Islands
- Grona reticulata (Champ. ex Benth.) H.Ohashi & K.Ohashi – Southeast Asia, China
- Grona retroflexa (L.) H.Ohashi & K.Ohashi – India, Sri Lanka, Thailand
- Grona rubra (Lour.) H.Ohashi & K.Ohashi – Cambodia, Vietnam, China (Guangdong, Hainan)
- Grona saulierei (Schindl.) Kottaim – India
- Grona schubertiae (H.Ohashi) H.Ohashi & K.Ohashi – Cambodia, Vietnam
- Grona schweinfurthii (Schindl.) H.Ohashi & K.Ohashi – Congo
- Grona setigera (E.Mey.) H.Ohashi & K.Ohashi – Cameroun, Congo, Ghana, Kenya, Liberia, Malawi, Mozambique, Nigeria, Rhodesia, South Africa, Tanganyika, Uganda, Zambia
- Grona stolzii (Schindl.) H.Ohashi & K.Ohashi – Burundi, Congo, Malawi, Tanzania, Zambia, Zaire, Zimbabwe
- Grona strigillosa (Schindl.) H.Ohashi & K.Ohashi – Southeast Asia, China
- Grona styracifolia (Osbeck) H.Ohashi & K.Ohashi – Sri Lanka, India, Myanmar, Thailand, Malaysia, Cambodia, Laos, Vietnam, China, Philippines, Indonesia (Sulawesi)
- Grona tiwiensis (Pedley) H.Ohashi & K.Ohashi – Australia (Northern Territory: Bathurst Island)
- Grona trichostachya (Benth.) H.Ohashi & K.Ohashi – New Guinea, Australia (Western Australia, Northern Territory, Queensland)
- Grona triflora (L.) H.Ohashi & K.Ohashi – tropical Asia and Africa
- Grona varians (Labill.) H.Ohashi & K.Ohashi – Australia, New Caledonia
- Grona vidalii (H.Ohashi) H.Ohashi & K.Ohashi – Laos
- Grona wittei (B.G.Schub.) H.Ohashi & K.Ohashi – Congo
- Grona wynaadensis (Bedd. ex Gamble) H.Ohashi & K.Ohashi – Southern India (Western Ghats, Nilgiri, Anamalai, Travancore Hills)
- Grona zenkeri (Schindl.) H.Ohashi & K.Ohashi – Cameroon
