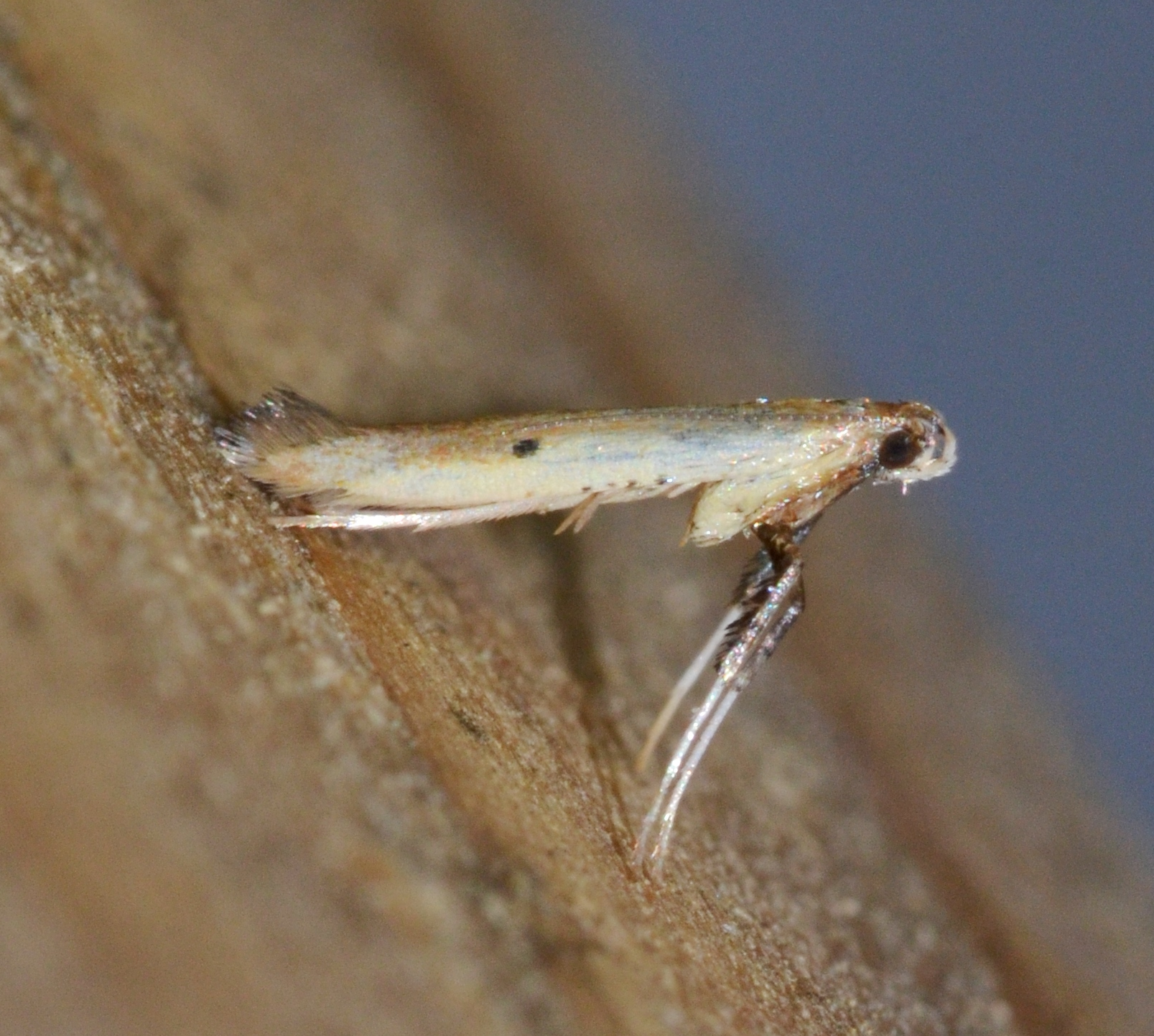

Scientific classification
- Kingdom: Animalia
- Phylum: Arthropoda
- Clade: Pancrustacea
- Class: Insecta
- Order: Lepidoptera
- Family: Gracillariidae
- Genus: Caloptilia
- Species: C. violacella

Binomial name
- Caloptilia violacella (Clemens, 1860)

Synonyms
- Caloptilia desmodifoliella (Clemens, 1865)

= Caloptilia violacella =

Species of moth

Caloptilia violacella is a moth of the family Gracillariidae. It is known from Illinois, Missouri, Florida, Georgia, Kentucky, Maine, Maryland, New York and Texas in the United States.

The wingspan is about 10 mm.

The larvae feed on Cajanus cajan, Desmodium species (including Desmodium rotundifolium) and Meibomia dillenii. They mine the leaves of their host plant.
