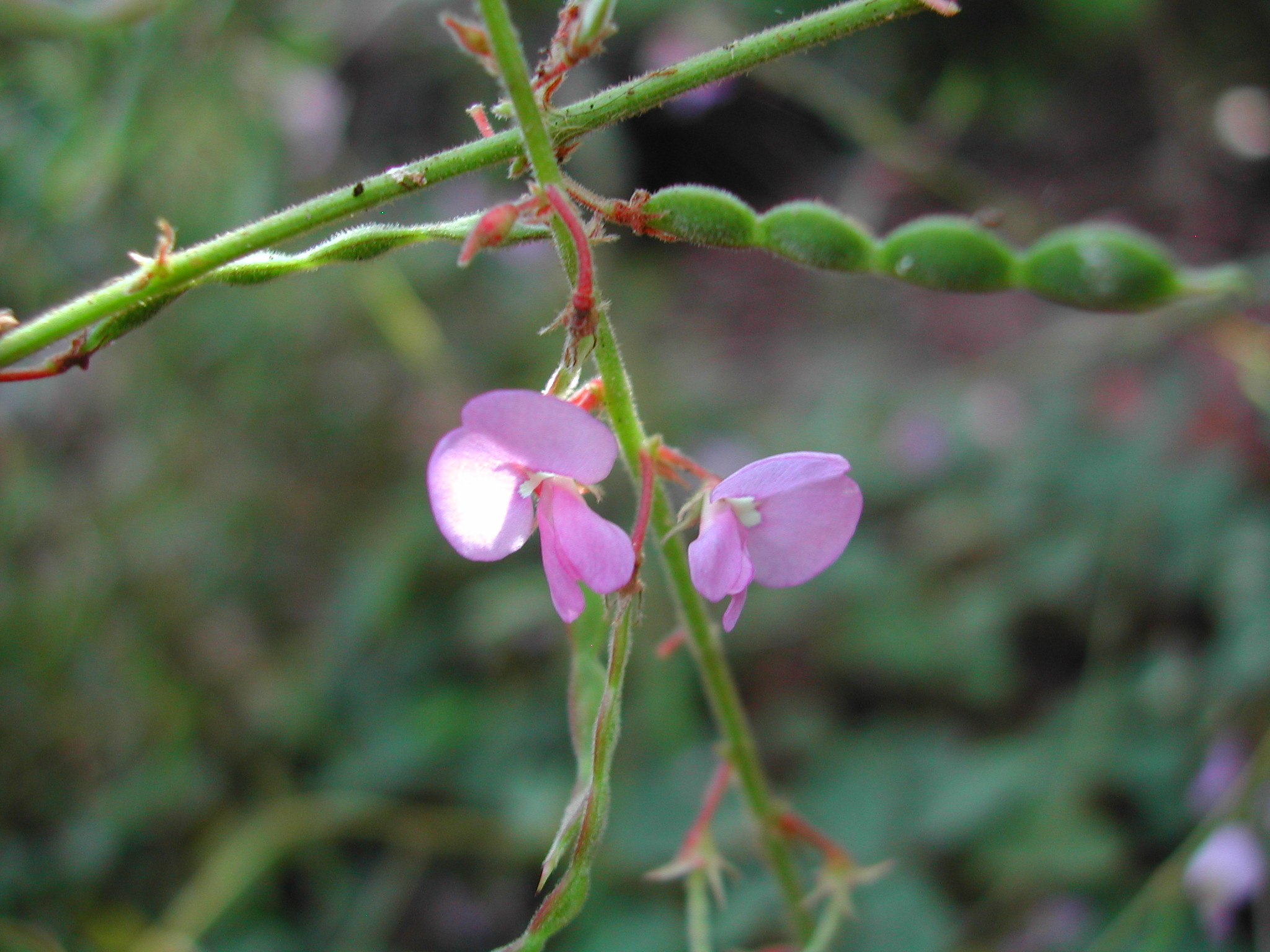
- Maekawaea rhytidophylla

Scientific classification
- Kingdom: Plantae
- Clade: Tracheophytes
- Clade: Angiosperms
- Clade: Eudicots
- Clade: Rosids
- Order: Fabales
- Family: Fabaceae
- Genus: Maekawaea; H.Ohashi & K.Ohashi (2020)

Species
- Maekawaea macrocarpa (Domin) H.Ohashi & K.Ohashi; Maekawaea rhytidophylla (F.Muell. ex Benth.) H.Ohashi & K.Ohashi; Maekawaea tenax (Schindl.) H.Ohashi & K.Ohashi

= Maekawaea =

Genus of flowering plants

Maekawaea is a genus of flowering plants in the pea family (Fabaceae). It includes three species native to New Guinea, New Caledonia, and Australia (New South Wales, Northern Territory, and Queensland).

It includes three accepted species, which were previously placed in genus Desmodium:

- Maekawaea macrocarpa (Domin) H.Ohashi & K.Ohashi – Queensland
- Maekawaea rhytidophylla (F.Muell. ex Benth.) H.Ohashi & K.Ohashi – New Guinea, New Caledonia, and Australia (New South Wales, Northern Territory, and Queensland)
- Maekawaea tenax (Schindl.) H.Ohashi & K.Ohashi – New Guinea and Queensland
