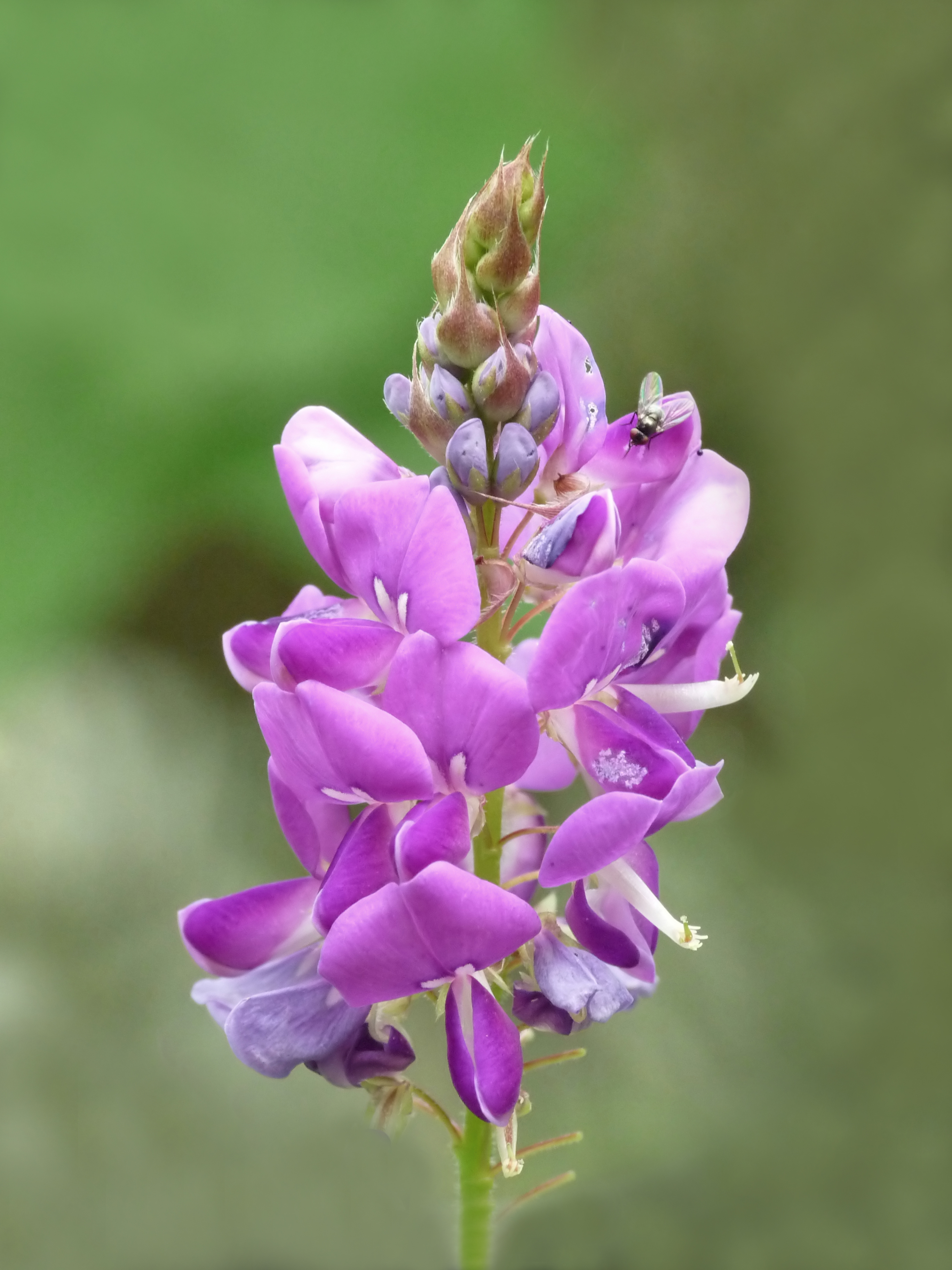
- Desmodium heterocarpon

Scientific classification
- Kingdom: Plantae
- Clade: Tracheophytes
- Clade: Angiosperms
- Clade: Eudicots
- Clade: Rosids
- Order: Fabales
- Family: Fabaceae
- Subfamily: Faboideae
- Tribe: Desmodieae
- Subtribe: Desmodiinae
- Genus: Desmodium; Desv. (1813), nom. cons.

Species
- Many, see text

Synonyms
- Cyclomorium Walp. (1843); Edusaron Medik. (1787), nom. superfl.; Meibomia Heist. ex Fabr. (1759), nom. rej.; Nephromeria (Benth.) Schindl. (1924); Nicolsonia DC. (1825); Nissoloides M.E.Jones (1933); Sagotia Duchass. & Walp. (1851); Tropitoma Raf. (1837)

= Desmodium =

Genus of legumes

Desmodium is a genus of plants in the legume family Fabaceae, sometimes called tick-trefoil, tick clover, hitch hikers or beggar lice. There are dozens of species and the delimitation of the genus has shifted much over time. Species are distributed widely – from Quebec to northern Argentina in the Americas, across northern and southern tropical Africa, in the southern Arabian Peninsula, in Myanmar and Thailand, New Guinea, and northern and eastern Australia.

== Description ==
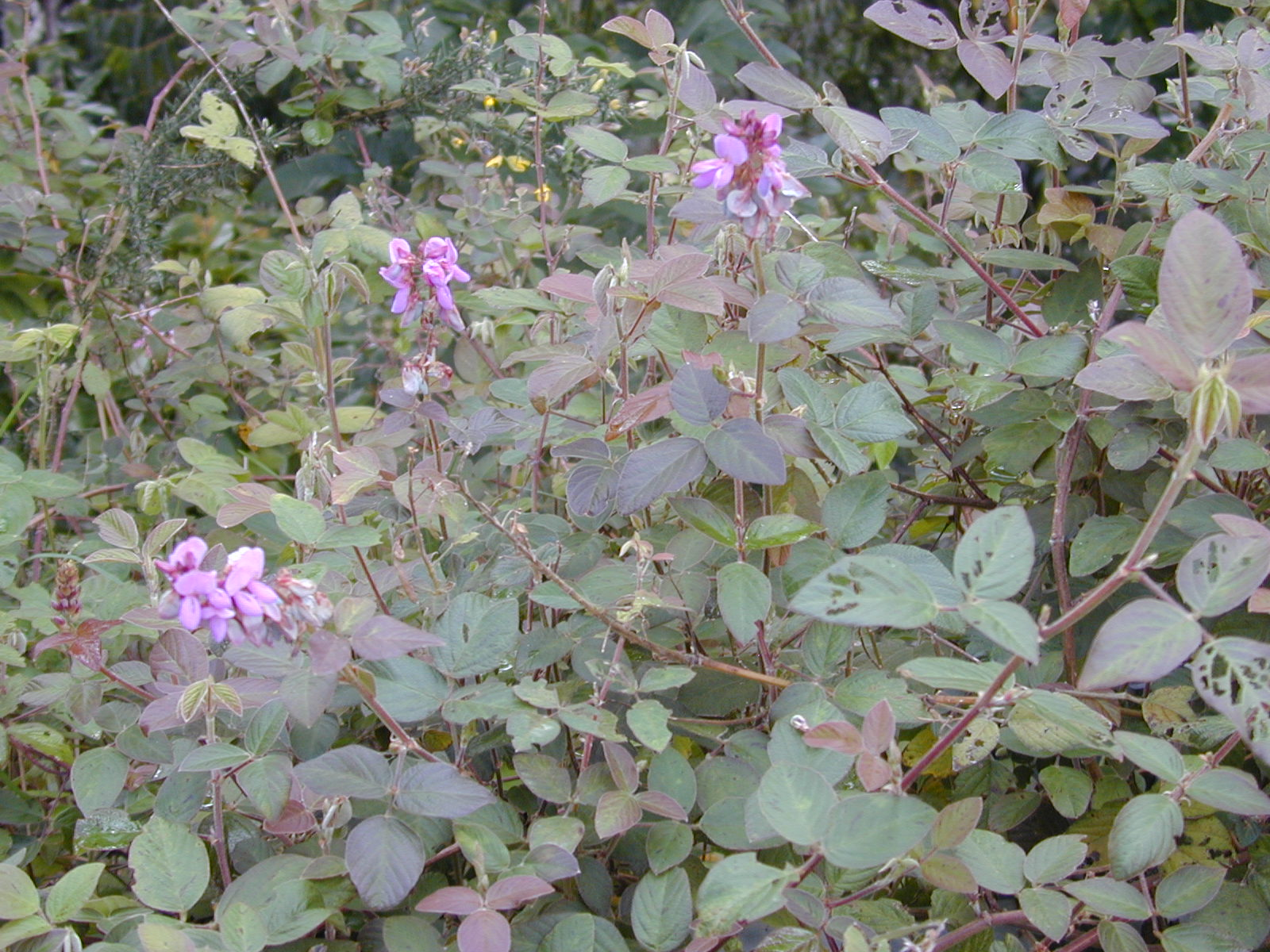
Desmodium intortum

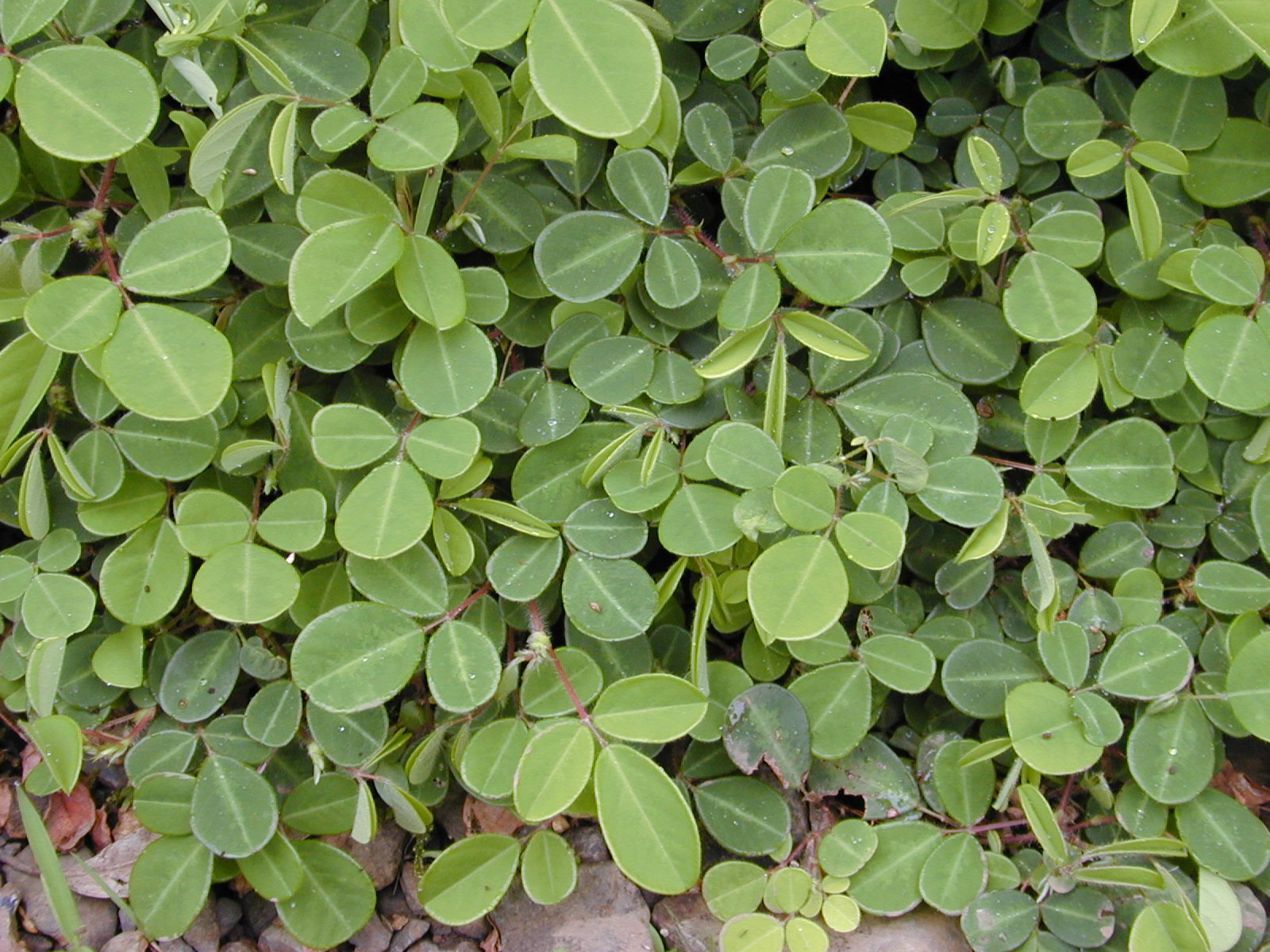
Desmodium triflorum

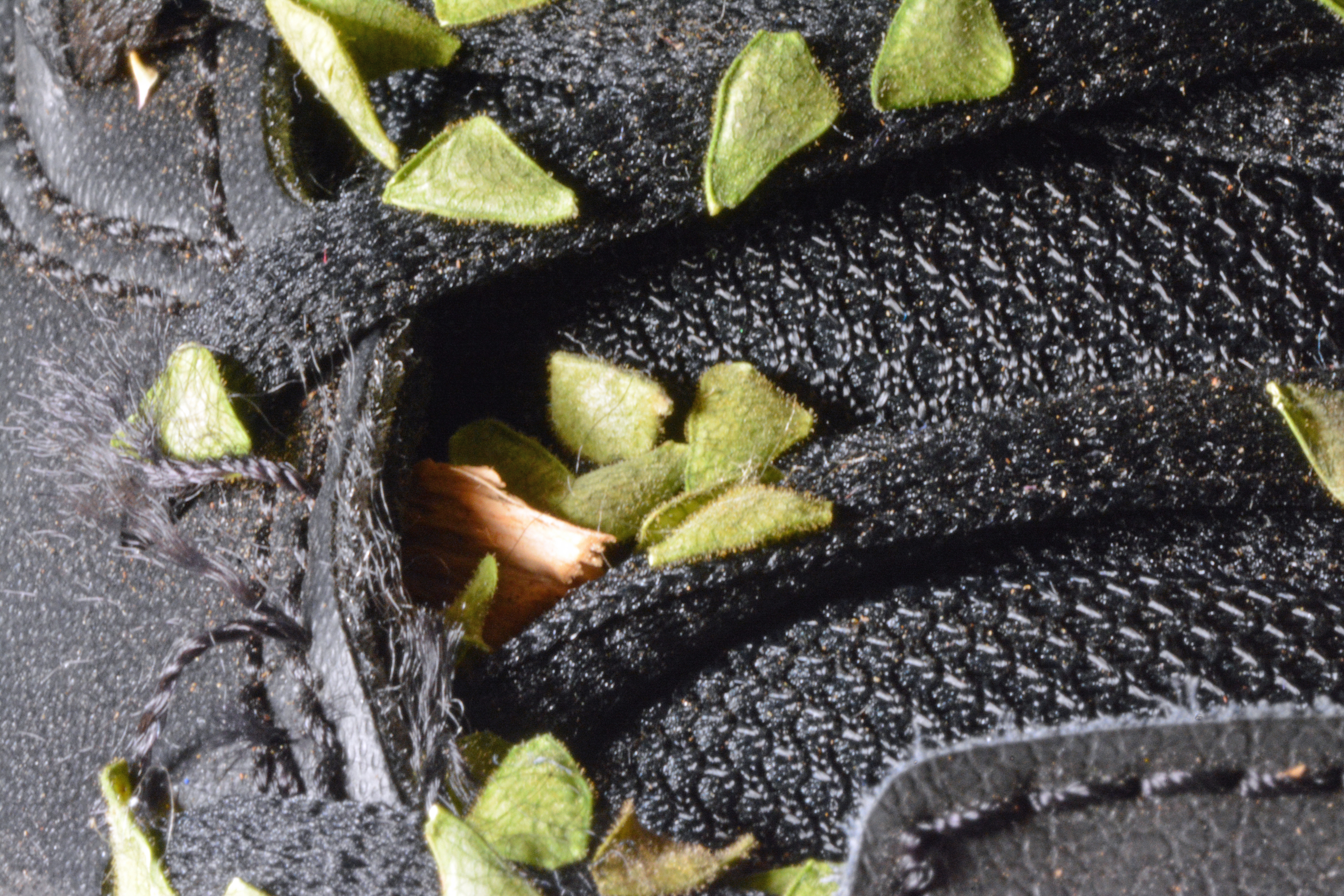
Beggar lice seeds readily stick to many objects, such as this shoe

These are mostly inconspicuous plants; few have bright or large flowers. Though some can become sizeable plants, most are herbs or small shrubs. Their fruit are loments, meaning each seed is dispersed individually enclosed in its segment. This makes them tenacious plants and some species are considered weeds in places.

== Uses ==
Several Desmodium species release organic compounds, aerially and into the soil, which make them useful for agriculture: Allelopathic compounds are used there via push-pull technology. For this Desmodium heterocarpon (now Grona heterocarpos), Desmodium intortum, and Desmodium uncinatum are inter-cropped in maize and sorghum fields to suppress witchweeds, including Asiatic witchweed (Striga asiatica) and purple witchweed (S. hermonthica) and to repel Chilo partellus, a stem-boring grass moth. Insects (including pests) are likewise repelled by high amounts of antixenotic allomones produced by Desmodium.

A blue dye is obtained from Desmodium incanum.

Tick-trefoils in agriculture can also be used as living mulch and as green manure, as they improve soil fertility via nitrogen fixation.

Most also make good fodder for animals including bobwhite, turkey, grouse, deer, cattle and goats.

Wild-living, non-farmed deer appear to rely on Desmodium species in certain areas, particularly during the more stressful summer months.

The caterpillars of the lesser grass blue (Zizina otis) and the two-barred flasher (Astraptes fulgerator) feed on tick-trefoils.

== Alkaloids ==
Some Desmodium species have formerly been known to contain high amounts of tryptamine alkaloids, but many of the tryptamine-containing species have since been transferred to other genera.

== Taxonomy and systematics ==
The taxonomy and systematics of the many dozens of Desmodium species are confusing and unresolved. Related genera such as Codariocalyx, Hylodesmum, Lespedeza, Ohwia, and Phyllodium were and sometimes still are included in Desmodium.

Taxonomic authorities commonly disagree about the naming and placement of species. For example, Desmodium spirale as described by August Grisebach might refer to a distinct species, but its validity is doubtful. The "Desmodium spirale" of other authorities may refer to D. neomexicanum, D. ospriostreblum, or D. procumbens. Similarly, the plant originally described as D. podocarpum by A. P. de Candolle is Hylodesmum podocarpum today, but "Desmodium podocarpum" might also refer to D. hookerianum or Hylodesmum laxum, depending on the taxonomic authority.

=== Selected species ===
Species include:

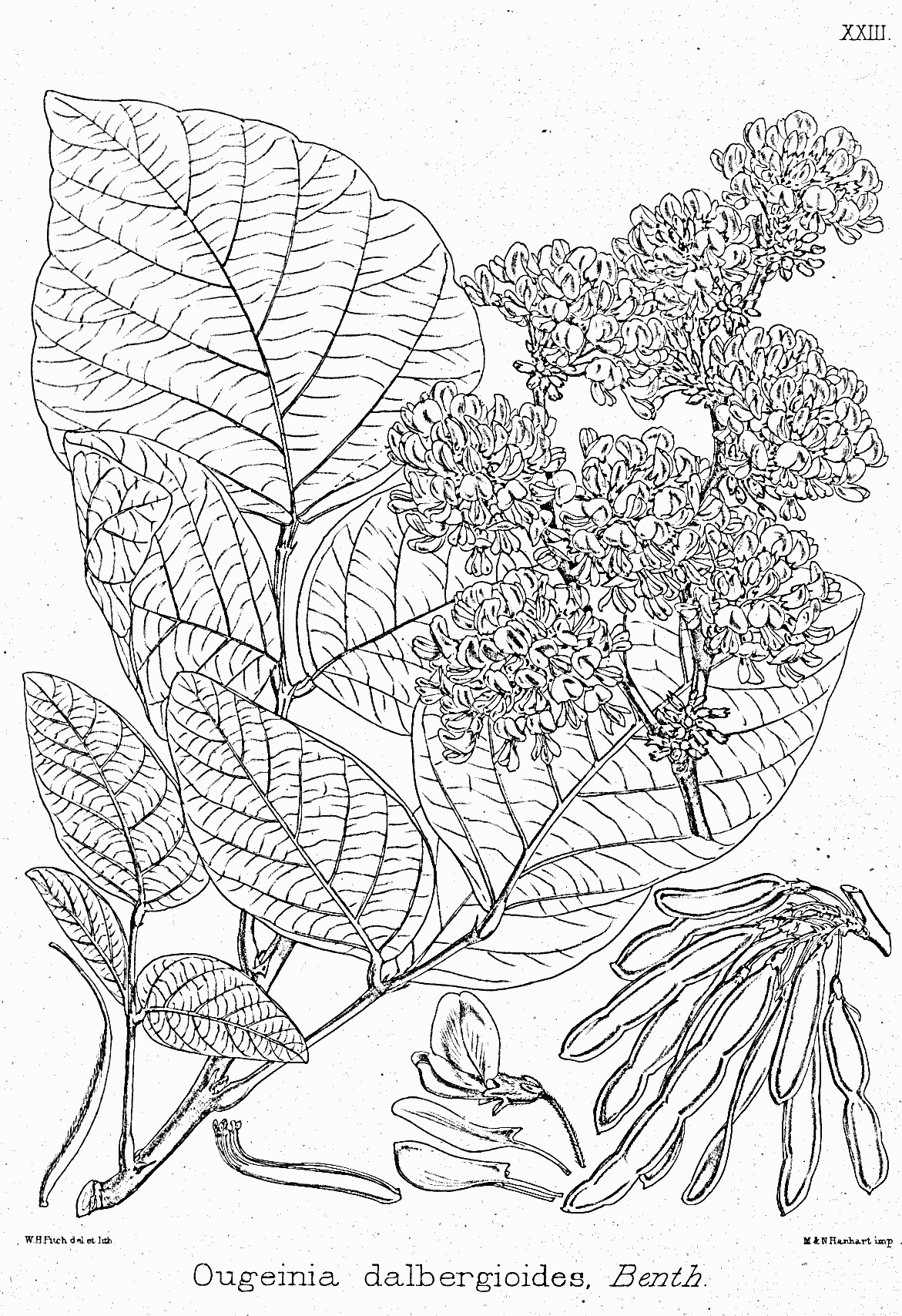
Desmodium oojeinense

- Desmodium acanthocladum F.Muell.
- Desmodium canadense (L.) DC. – showy tick-trefoil, Canadian tick-trefoil
- Desmodium canescens (L.) DC. – hoary tick-trefoil
- Desmodium ciliare (Muhl.) DC. – hairy small-leaved tick-trefoil
- Desmodium cuspidatum (Muhl.) Loudon – toothed tick-trefoil, large-bracted tick-trefoil
- Desmodium fernaldii B.G.Schub.
- Desmodium glabellum (Michx.) DC.
- Desmodium × humifusum (Muhl. ex Bigelow) Beck
- Desmodium illinoense A.Gray – Illinois tick-trefoil
- Desmodium incanum (Sw.) DC. – creeping beggarweed, Spanish tick-trefoil, Kaimi clover
- Desmodium intortum Greenleaf desmodium, kuru vine, beggarlice, tick clovers
- Desmodium lineatum (Michx.) DC. – linear-leaved tick-trefoil
- Desmodium marilandicum (L.) DC. – smooth small-leaved tick-trefoil
- Desmodium molliculum (Kunth) DC.
- Desmodium ospriostreblum Chiov.
- Desmodium paniculatum (L.) DC. – panicled tick-trefoil
- Desmodium perplexum B.G.Schub. – perplexed tick-trefoil
- Desmodium rotundifolium DC. – round-leaved tick-trefoil, dollar leaf
- Desmodium sessilifolium (Torr. ex M.A.Curtis) Torr. & A.Gray
- Desmodium tortuosum (Sw.) DC.
- Desmodium triflorum (L.) DC.
- Desmodium tweedyi Britton – Tweedy's tick-trefoil
- Desmodium uncinatum (Jacq.) DC.– silver-leaved tick-trefoil, silverleaf
- Desmodium varians (Labill.) G.Don

=== Formerly placed here ===
- Codariocalyx motorius – telegraph plant (as D. gyrans, D. motorium, D. roylei)
- Dendrolobium triangulare (as D. Desmodium umbellatum Moritz.)
- Dendrolobium umbellatum (as D. umbellatum (L.) Benth. )
- Grona heterocarpos (as D. heterocarpon (Michx.) DC.)
- Hylodesmum laxum (as D. laxum DC.)
  - Hylodesmum laxum ssp. laxum (as D. austro-japonense, D. bambusetorum, D. gardneri auct. non Benth., D. laxiflorum sensu Miq., D. laxum var. kiusianum, D. laxum ssp. laxum, D. podocarpum auct. non DC. non Hook. & Arn., D. podocarpum DC. var. gardneri sensu Bedd., D. podocarpum DC. var. laxum)
- Hylodesmum leptopus (as D. gardneri Benth., D. laxum auct. non DC., D. laxum ssp. leptopus, D. leptopus, D. tashiroi)
- Hylodesmum podocarpum (as D. podocarpum DC., D. podocarpum DC. var. indicum, D. podocarpum DC. var. japonicum)
  - Hylodesmum podocarpum ssp. oxyphyllum (as D. fallax var. mandshuricum, D. japonicum, D. mandshuricum, D. oxyphyllum DC., D. podocarpum DC. var. mandshuricum, D. podocarpum DC. ssp./var. oxyphyllum, D. podocarpum DC. var. polyphyllum, D. podocarpum DC. var. typicum, D. racemosum)
- Lespedeza thunbergii (as D. formosum, D. thunbergii)

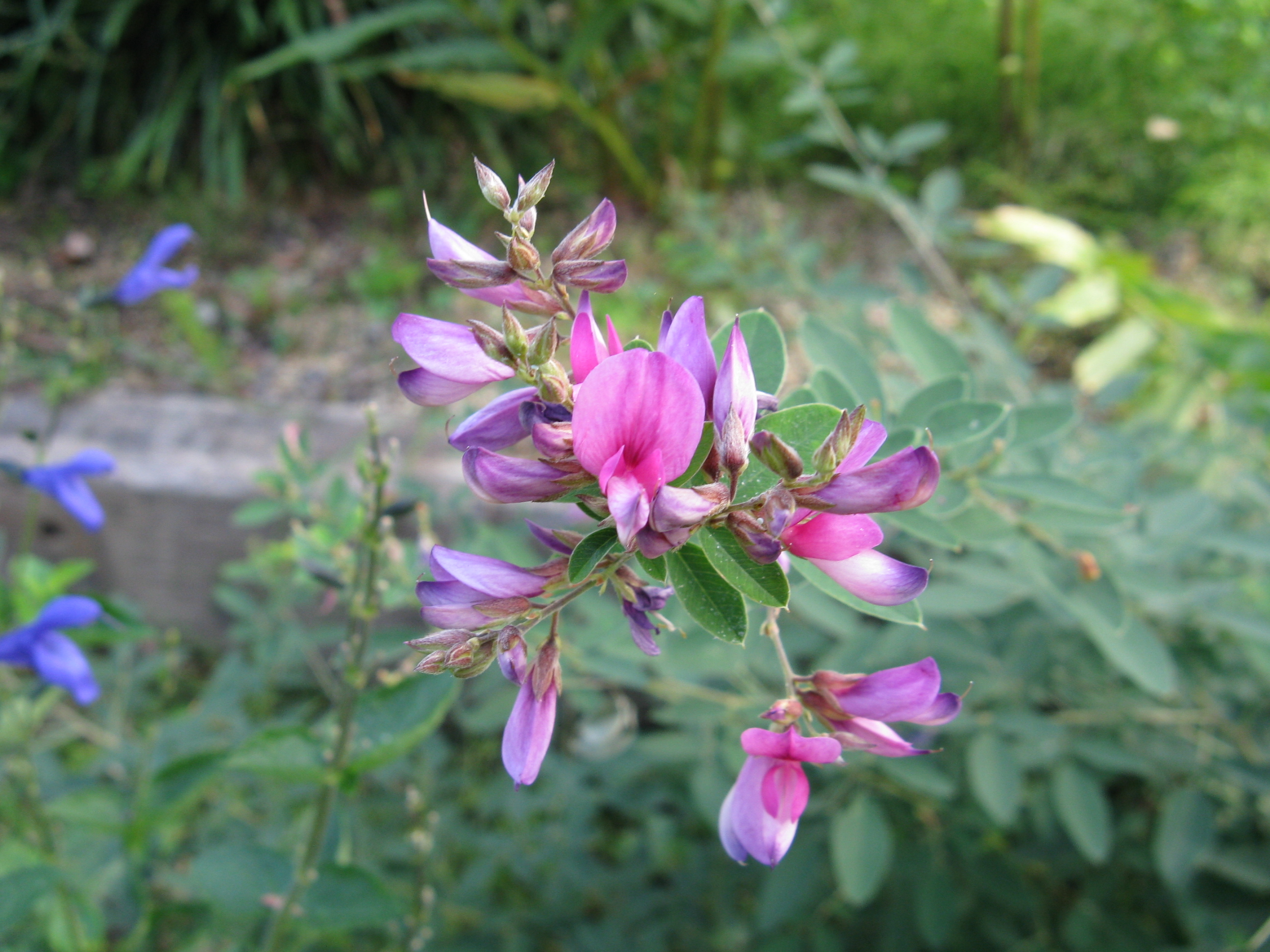
Lespedeza thunbergii was formerly known as Desmodium formosum and Desmodium thunbergii

  - Lespedeza thunbergii var. thunbergii (as D. penduliflorum Oudem.)
- Maekawaea macrocarpa (as D. macrocarpum)
- Maekawaea rhytidophylla (as D. rhytidophyllum)
- Maekawaea tenax (as D. tenax)
- Ohwia caudata (as D. caudatum)
- Phyllodium pulchellum (as D. pulchellum)

== Pharmacology of Desmodium adscendens ==
Experimental studies have identified several biological activities associated with extracts of Desmodium adscendens, a species within the genus Desmodium.

From a pharmacological perspective, certain compounds present in the plant, particularly triterpenoid saponins and flavonoids, may modulate calcium-activated potassium channels (Ca²⁺-activated K⁺ channels), leading to membrane hyperpolarization, reduced calcium influx, and relaxation of smooth muscle. These effects have been associated with bronchodilatory activity observed in experimental models.

Additional studies suggest that Desmodium adscendens extracts may influence arachidonic acid metabolism, including modulation of cytochrome P450-dependent pathways, cyclooxygenase activity, and the production of inflammatory mediators such as prostaglandins and leukotrienes.

In vitro and animal studies have shown that certain fractions of the plant can inhibit antigen-induced airway smooth muscle contractions, suggesting an effect on early stages of inflammatory mediator release.

Preclinical data have also reported hepatoprotective effects of Desmodium adscendens extracts in models of chemically induced liver injury, including reduction of liver damage and decreased levels of circulating liver enzymes.

These effects may be partly related to the antioxidant activity of flavonoids present in the plant, including schaftoside, a C-glycosyl flavonoid involved in cellular protection against oxidative stress.

In the field of dietary supplements, extracts of Desmodium adscendens are sometimes standardized to ensure consistency and reproducibility. This standardization often relies on the quantification of specific constituents, particularly C-glycoside flavonoids such as schaftoside, used as an analytical marker.

The term "desmodeine" is occasionally used in this context to refer to such extracts, although it does not correspond to a chemically defined substance in the scientific literature and lacks standardized definition.
