= Wild groundnut =

Wild groundnut or wild ground nut may refer to the following plant species:

- Apios americana
- Calopogonium mucunoides
- Grona adscendens
