= Beggarweed =

Beggarweed may refer to:

- Cuscuta, a genus of parasitic plants in the morning glory family
- Desmodium incanum, a perennial plant native to Central and South America
- Grona triflora, a perennial plant found in most tropical and subtropical regions
