= Dendrolobium baccatum =

Scientific classification
- Kingdom: Plantae
- Clade: Tracheophytes
- Clade: Angiosperms
- Clade: Eudicots
- Clade: Rosids
- Order: Fabales
- Family: Fabaceae
- Subfamily: Faboideae
- Genus: Dendrolobium
- Species: D. baccatum

Binomial name
- Dendrolobium baccatum Schindl.

Synonyms
- Desmodium baccatum Schindl.; Desmodium clovissii Gagnep.

Species of legume

Dendrolobium baccatum is a species of flowering plants in the Fabaceae family. A shrub, it occurs in Mainland Southeast Asia. People use it for food and fuel.

== Description ==
This plant grows as a shrub some 1 to 2m tall. It flowers in October and November, fruits in December and January and can possess leaves all year round (becoming deciduous during prolonged dry periods).

== Distribution ==
This species is found in Thailand, Cambodia, Vietnam and Laos.

== Habitat ==
Dendrolobium baccatum is occurs in open and wet forests on peaty, clayey soils, and in scrub up to 900m elevation. On islands of the Mekong river in Kratié and Stung Treng provinces, Cambodia, the shrub is medium abundant in Deciduous forest with bamboo and Mixed evergreen forest formations. It grows there on soils derived from a metamorphic sandstone bedrock, at 25 to 30m elevation.

== Vernacular names ==
The shrub is called trônum bangkuëy (="habitat of lizards") in Khmer, ba chẽ quả mọng in Vietnamese.

== Uses ==
The young fruit of the plant are edible, the wood makes excellent firewood.
