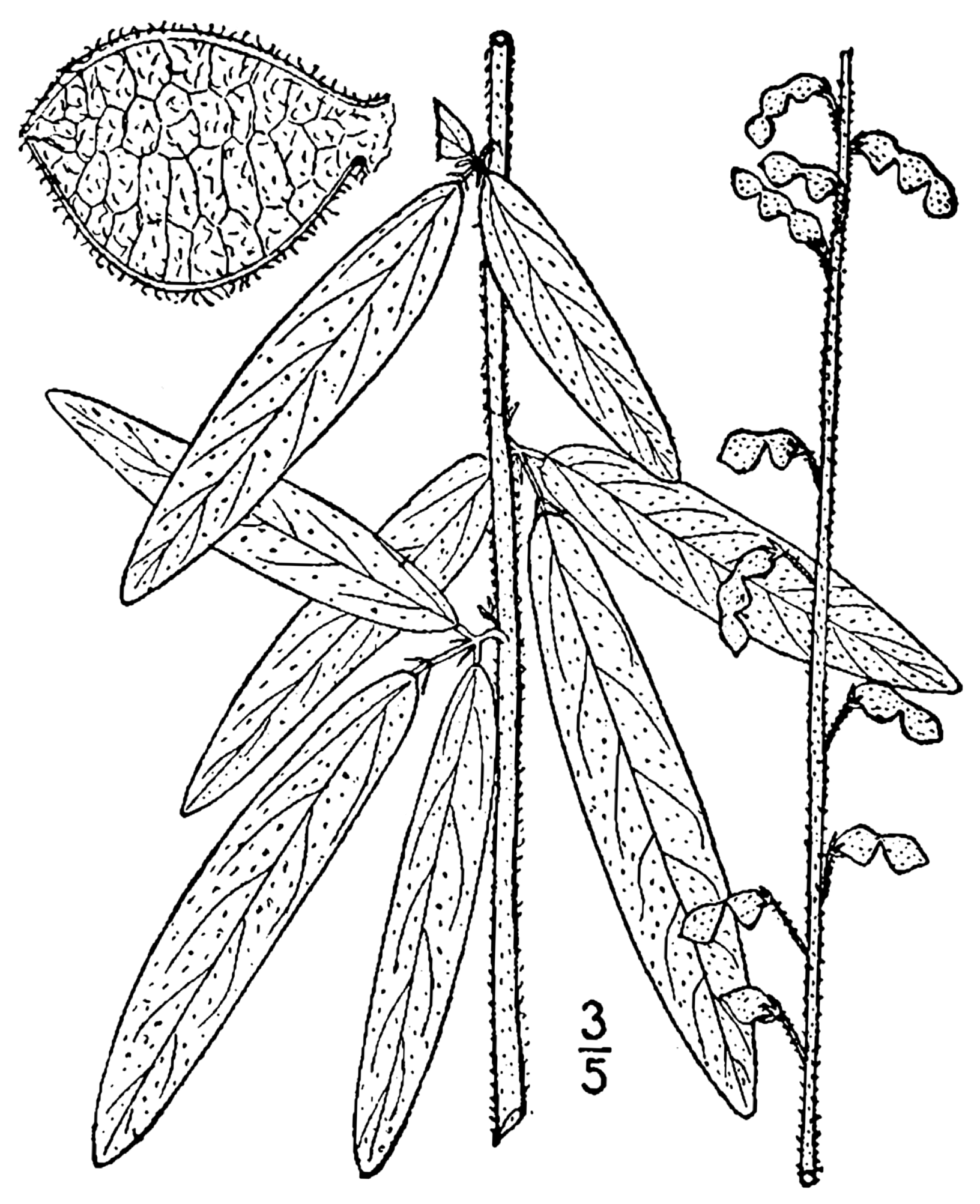
- Botanical illustration

Scientific classification
- Kingdom: Plantae
- Clade: Tracheophytes
- Clade: Angiosperms
- Clade: Eudicots
- Clade: Rosids
- Order: Fabales
- Family: Fabaceae
- Subfamily: Faboideae
- Genus: Desmodium
- Species: D. sessilifolium

Binomial name
- Desmodium sessilifolium (Torr. ex M.A.Curtis) Torr. & A. Gray

= Desmodium sessilifolium =

Species of legume

Desmodium sessilifolium, common name sessileleaf ticktrefoil, is a species of plant in the legume family, Fabaceae. It is native to North America.

== Conservation status ==
It is listed as endangered and extirpated in Maryland, endangered in New Jersey and Ohio, extirpated in Pennsylvania, and threatened in Rhode Island. It is a special concern and believed extirpated in Connecticut.
