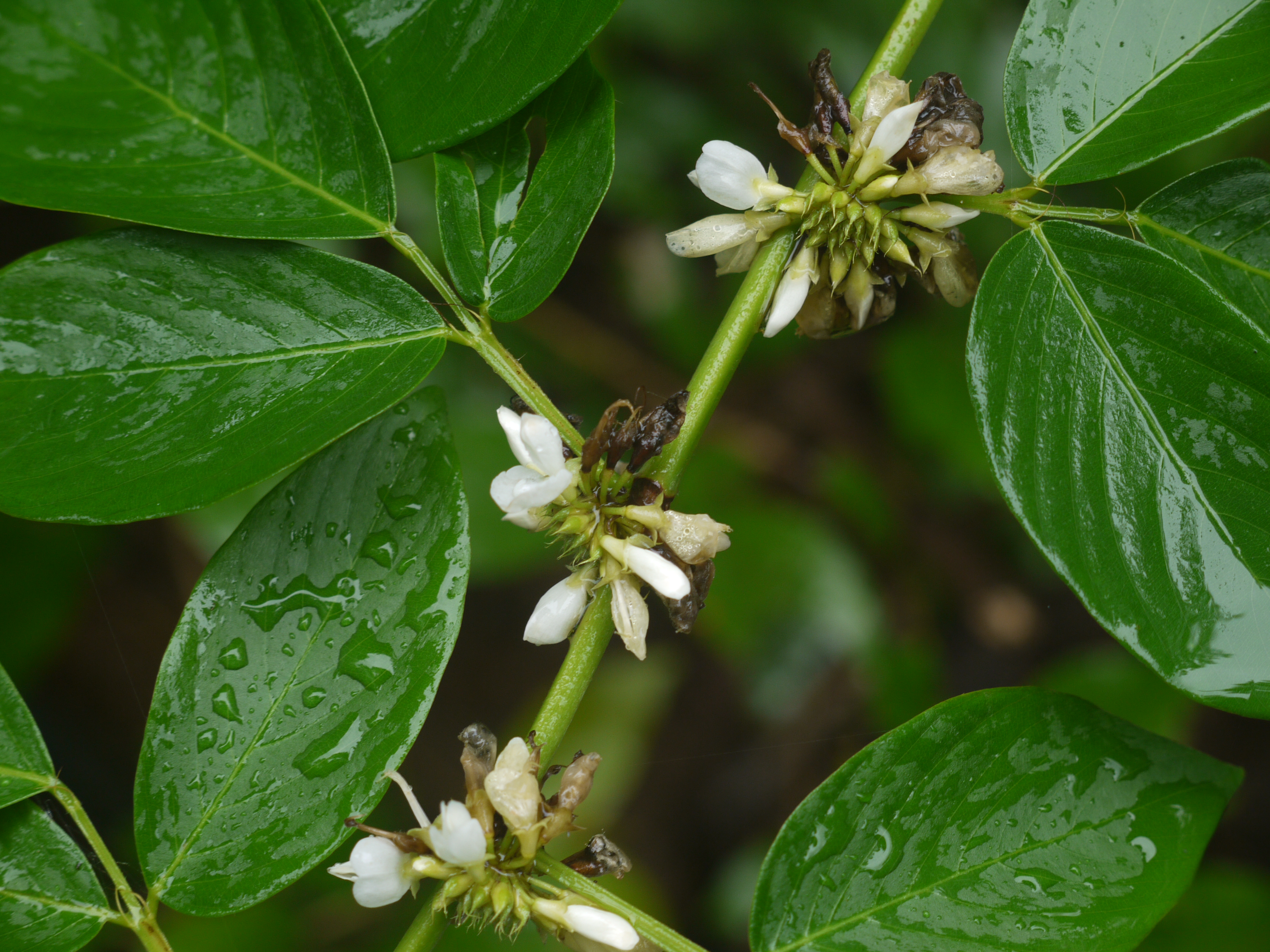
- Dendrolobium triangulare

Scientific classification
- Kingdom: Plantae
- Clade: Tracheophytes
- Clade: Angiosperms
- Clade: Eudicots
- Clade: Rosids
- Order: Fabales
- Family: Fabaceae
- Subfamily: Faboideae
- Tribe: Desmodieae
- Genus: Dendrolobium (Wight & Arn.) Benth. (1852)

Species
- 19; see text

Synonyms
- Holtzea Schindl. (1926)

= Dendrolobium =

Genus of plants

Dendrolobium is a genus of flowering plants in the legume family, Fabaceae. It belongs to the subfamily Faboideae. It includes 21 species of mostly trees and shrubs and rarely herbs. Species range from eastern Africa (Kenya and Tanzania) to Madagascar, India, Indochina, southern China, Malesia, Papuasia, northern and western Australia, and the southwestern Pacific. Typical habitats include seasonally-dry tropical forest and woodland, bamboo thickets, and grassland.

== Accepted species ==
21 species are accepted:

- Dendrolobium arbuscula (Domin) Ohashi
- Dendrolobium baccatum (Schindl.) Schindl.
- Dendrolobium cheelii (C.A.Gardner) Pedley
- Dendrolobium cumingianum Benth.
- Dendrolobium dispermum (Hayata) Schindl.
- Dendrolobium geesinkii Ohashi
- Dendrolobium lanceolatum (Dunn) Schindl.
- Dendrolobium multiflorum Pedley
- Dendrolobium olivaceum (Prain) Schindl.
- Dendrolobium papuacola Ohashi & T.Nemoto
- Dendrolobium polyneurum (S.T.Blake) Ohashi
- Dendrolobium quinquepetalum (Blanco) Schindl.
- Dendrolobium rostratum (Schindl.) Schindl.
- Dendrolobium rugosum (Prain) Schindl.
- Dendrolobium stipatum S.T.Blake
- Dendrolobium thorelii (Gagnep.) Schindl.
- Dendrolobium triangulare (Retz.) Schindl.
- Dendrolobium umbellatum (L.) Benth.
- Dendrolobium ursinum (Schindl.) Schindl.
