= Desmodium × humifusum =

Conservation status
- Critically Imperiled (NatureServe)

Scientific classification
- Kingdom: Plantae
- Clade: Tracheophytes
- Clade: Angiosperms
- Clade: Eudicots
- Clade: Rosids
- Order: Fabales
- Family: Fabaceae
- Subfamily: Faboideae
- Genus: Desmodium
- Species: D. × humifusum

Binomial name
- Desmodium × humifusum (Muhl. ex Bigelow) Beck

Nothospecies of plant

Desmodium × humifusum is a species of flowering plant in the legume family known by the common names trailing tick-trefoil, eastern trailing tick-trefoil, and spreading tick-trefoil. It is native to the eastern United States, where it has been reduced to scattered populations in the states of Massachusetts, Connecticut, and Indiana. It once had a wider distribution but it has likely been extirpated from Delaware, Maryland, New Jersey, New York, Rhode Island, Virginia, West Virginia, and Missouri.

This plant is prostrate, its hairy stems trailing up to 2 metres (7 ft) long. One plant may have a large number of stems. The alternately arranged leaves are each divided into 3 leaflets up to 7 centimetres (3 in) long by 5 centimetres (2 in) wide. The leaves have persistent stipules which may aid in identification. The inflorescence is a raceme of purple flowers nearly one centimeter long. Blooming occurs in July and August. The fruit is a legume pod jointed into three or four segments, with each segment up to 8 millimetres (1/3 in) long. The segments are dispersed on animal fur. This species is probably a hybrid of Desmodium paniculatum and D. rotundifolium.

This plant grows on sandy soils that originated from sandstone and chert. The habitat is often dominated by oaks, and it may be a type of dry forest.
