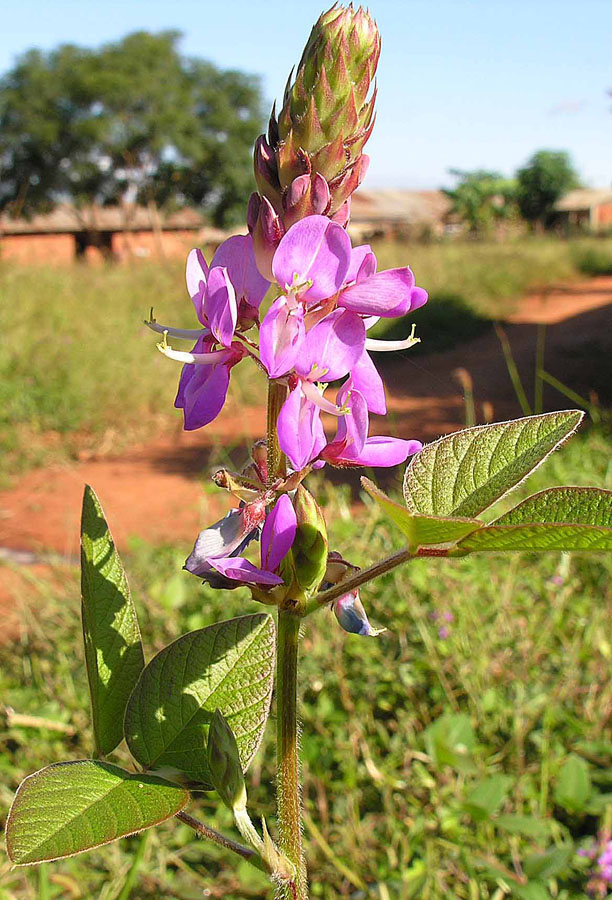
- Flowerhead
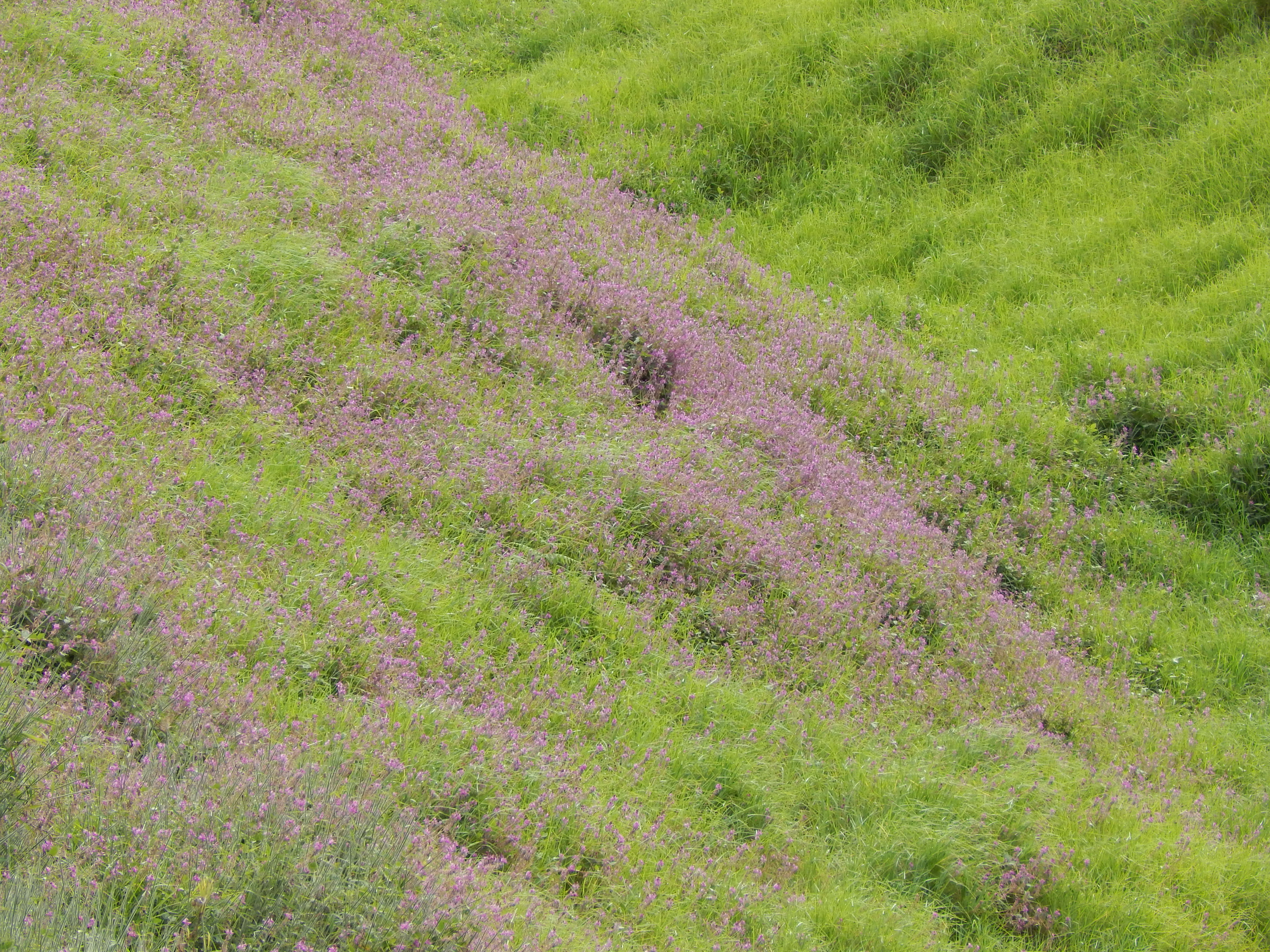
- In Hawaii

Scientific classification
- Kingdom: Plantae
- Clade: Tracheophytes
- Clade: Angiosperms
- Clade: Eudicots
- Clade: Rosids
- Order: Fabales
- Family: Fabaceae
- Subfamily: Faboideae
- Genus: Desmodium
- Species: D. intortum

Binomial name
- Desmodium intortum (Mill.) Urb.

Synonyms
- List: Desmodium adhaesivum Schltdl.; Desmodium aparines (Link) DC.; Desmodium intortum var. apiculatum B.G.Schub.; Desmodium nantouensis Y.C.Liu & F.Y.Lu; Desmodium sonorae A.Gray; Desmodium trigonum (Sw.) DC.; Hedysarum aparines Link; Hedysarum intortum Mill.; Hedysarum trigonum Sw.; Meibomia adhaesiva (Schltdl.) Kuntze; Meibomia aparines (Link) Schindl.; Meibomia balaensis Schindl.; Meibomia intorta (Mill.) S.F.Blake; Meibomia sonorae (A.Gray) Kuntze; Meibomia trigona Gandara

= Desmodium intortum =

Species of flowering plant

Desmodium intortum, known as greenleaf desmodium and also as beggarlice along with other members of its genus, is a species of flowering plant in the genus Desmodium, native to Mexico, Central America, northern South America, the Galápagos, Haiti and Jamaica. A nitrogen-fixing fodder crop, it has been introduced to the rest of the world's tropics, including Africa, India, Australia, New Guinea and Taiwan.

Desmodium intortum is used in push–pull agricultural pest management since it contains potent secondary metabolites that are released into the soil and aerially. Inter-cropped in maize and sorghum fields, it repels Chilo partellus, a stem-boring grass moth, and Fall armyworm (Spodoptera fugiperda), a polyphagous noctuid moth. It also suppresses witchweeds, including Asiatic witchweed (Striga asiatica) and purple witchweed (S. hermonthica).
