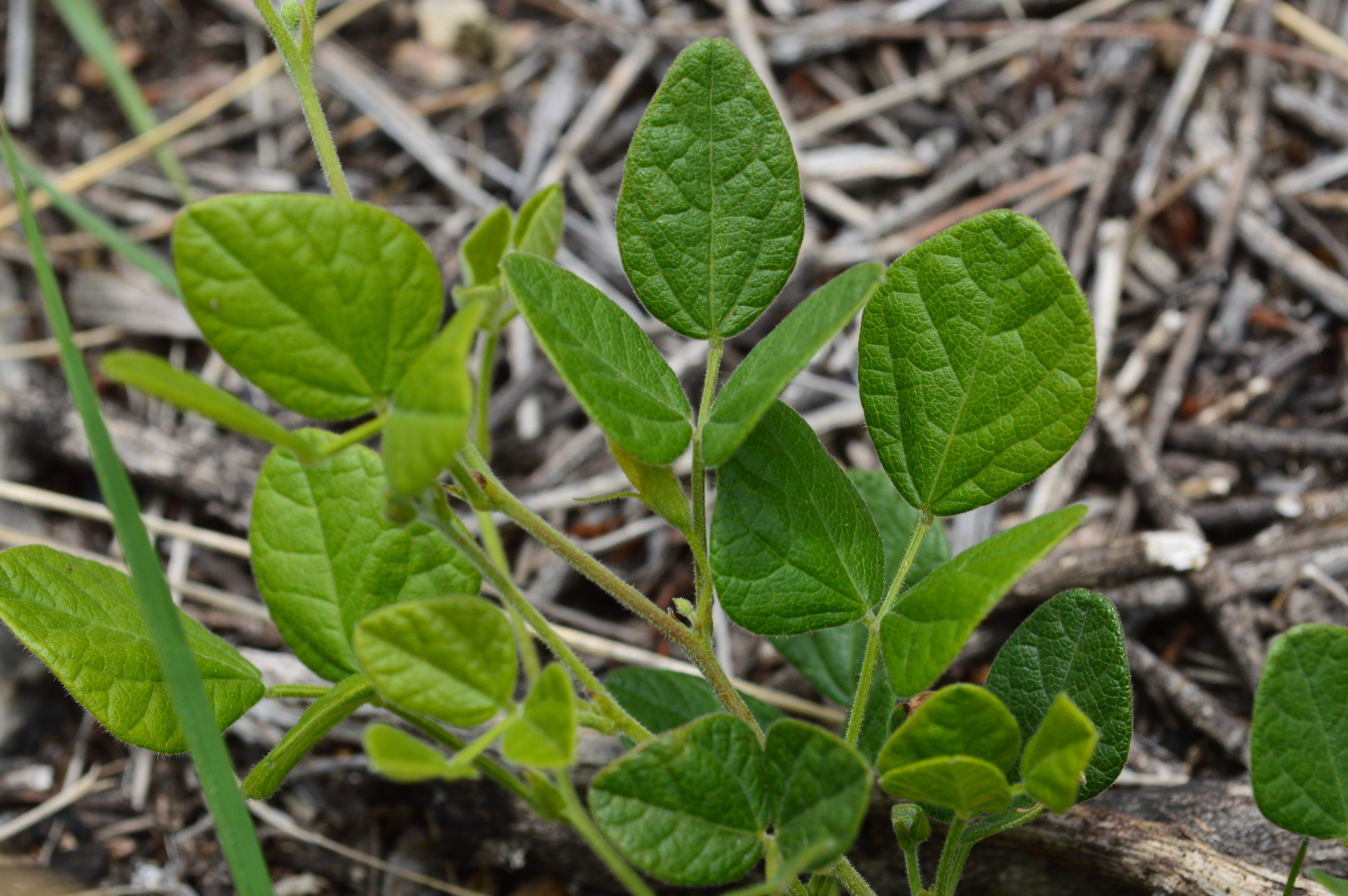

Scientific classification
- Kingdom: Plantae
- Clade: Tracheophytes
- Clade: Angiosperms
- Clade: Eudicots
- Clade: Rosids
- Order: Fabales
- Family: Fabaceae
- Subfamily: Faboideae
- Genus: Desmodium
- Species: D. molliculum

Binomial name
- Desmodium molliculum (Kunth) DC., 1825

= Desmodium molliculum =

Species of legume

Desmodium molliculum, called manayupa or pata de perro in Peru, is a perennial herb in the pea family, Fabaceae.

== Uses ==
In Peru it is used in traditional medicine for wound healing and its antiinflammatory and antiseptic properties.
