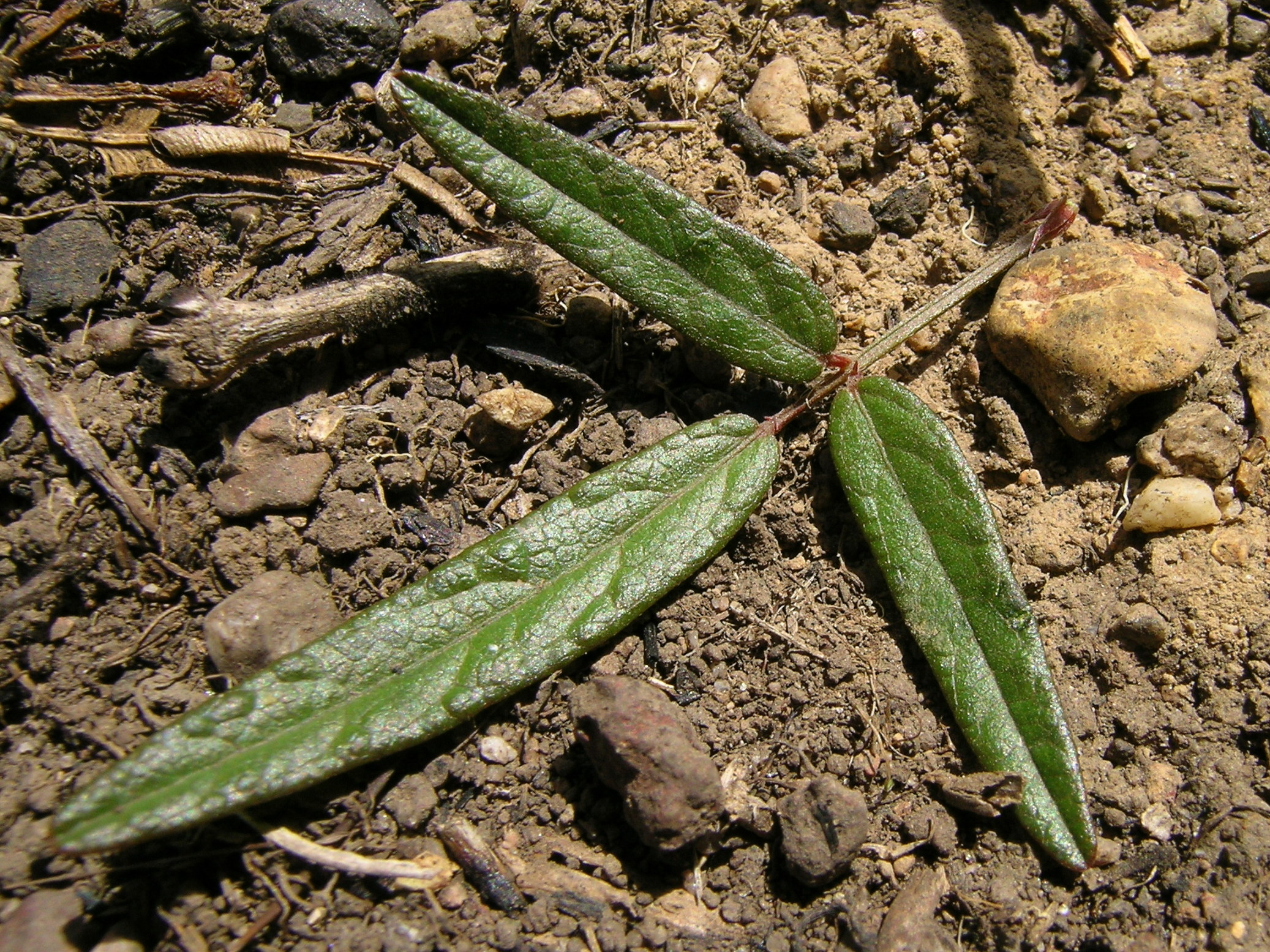

Scientific classification
- Kingdom: Plantae
- Clade: Tracheophytes
- Clade: Angiosperms
- Clade: Eudicots
- Clade: Rosids
- Order: Fabales
- Family: Fabaceae
- Subfamily: Faboideae
- Genus: Desmodium
- Species: D. varians

Binomial name
- Desmodium varians (Labill.) G.Don

= Desmodium varians =

Species of legume

Desmodium varians is a small climbing or prostrate herb in the family Fabaceae. A widespread species but not commonly seen, found in eastern Australia. Attractive pink flowers may form at any time of the year. The specific epithet varians is derived from Latin, referring to the variable habit and leaves.

== Habitat ==
Desmodium can occur in a number of soil types, but more fertile loam is preferred. Until seeds or fruits grow, it is widespread but often ignored. They are widespread in Qld, NSW, Vic, and Tas. It is found in forests of eucalyptus, woods and grassy woodlands.
