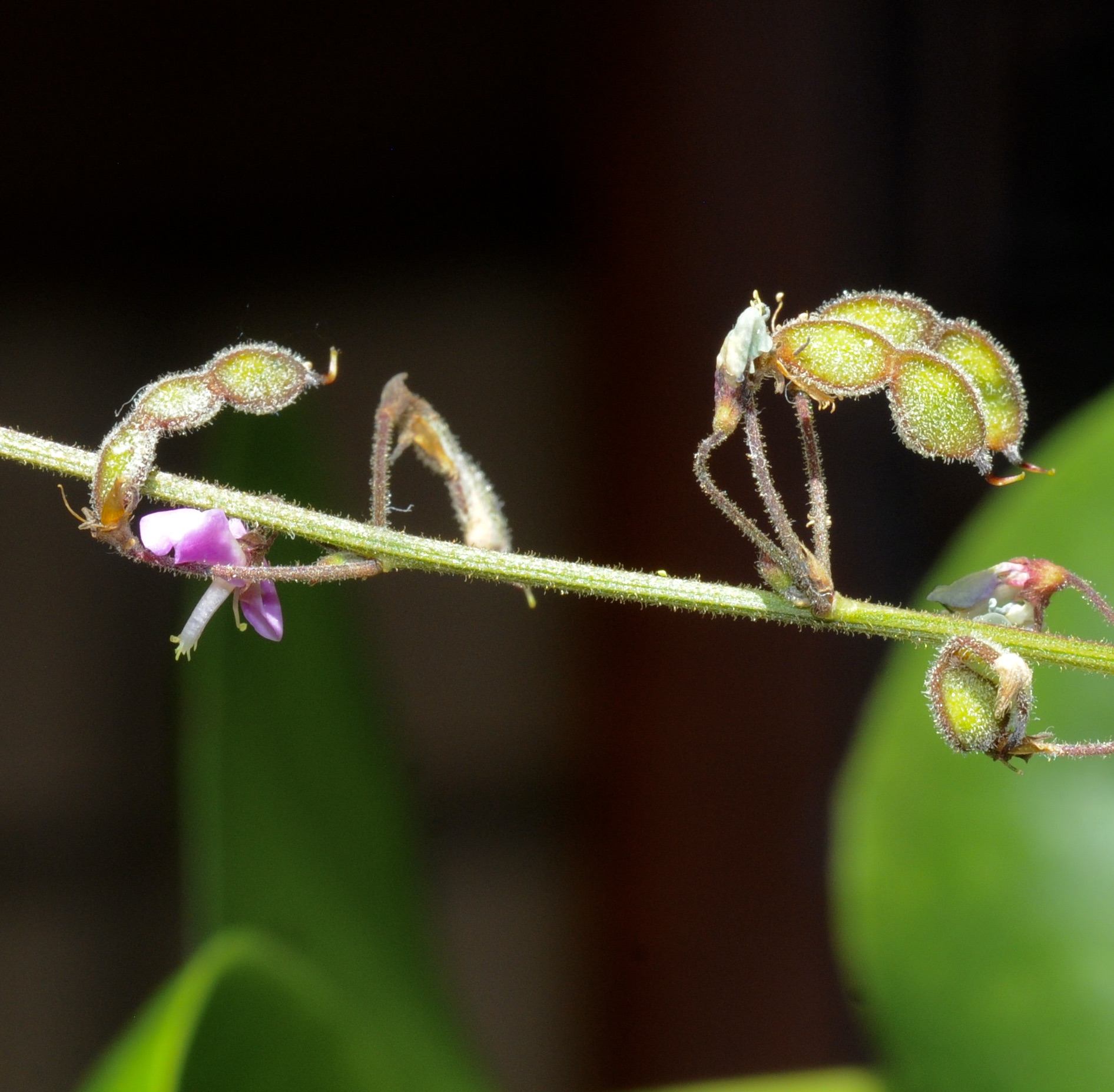

Scientific classification
- Kingdom: Plantae
- Clade: Tracheophytes
- Clade: Angiosperms
- Clade: Eudicots
- Clade: Rosids
- Order: Fabales
- Family: Fabaceae
- Subfamily: Faboideae
- Genus: Desmodium
- Species: D. ciliare

Binomial name
- Desmodium ciliare (Muhl. ex Willd.) DC.

= Desmodium ciliare =

Species of plant

Desmodium ciliare, the hairy small-leaf ticktrefoil, is a perennial forb native to North America. It grows 0.2-1.0 meters tall, has alternate, trifoliolate compound leaves, and pink or purple flowers.

== Distribution and habitat ==
Desmodium ciliare is distributed from Massachusetts west to Indiana, Missouri, and southeast Kansas, and south to southern Florida and Texas. It grows in fields, woodland borders, and disturbed areas. It tends to be found in mesic areas, and prefers-medium to fine-textured soil that is slightly acidic to soil in pH.

== Ecology ==
Desmodium ciliare benefits from fire disturbance, and has been shown to increase in frequency in response to fire. Its flower production also increases with burning regiments, although surface fires can decrease germination. Soil disturbance, such as from clearcutting and chopping or military training, reduces its presence in pine communities.
