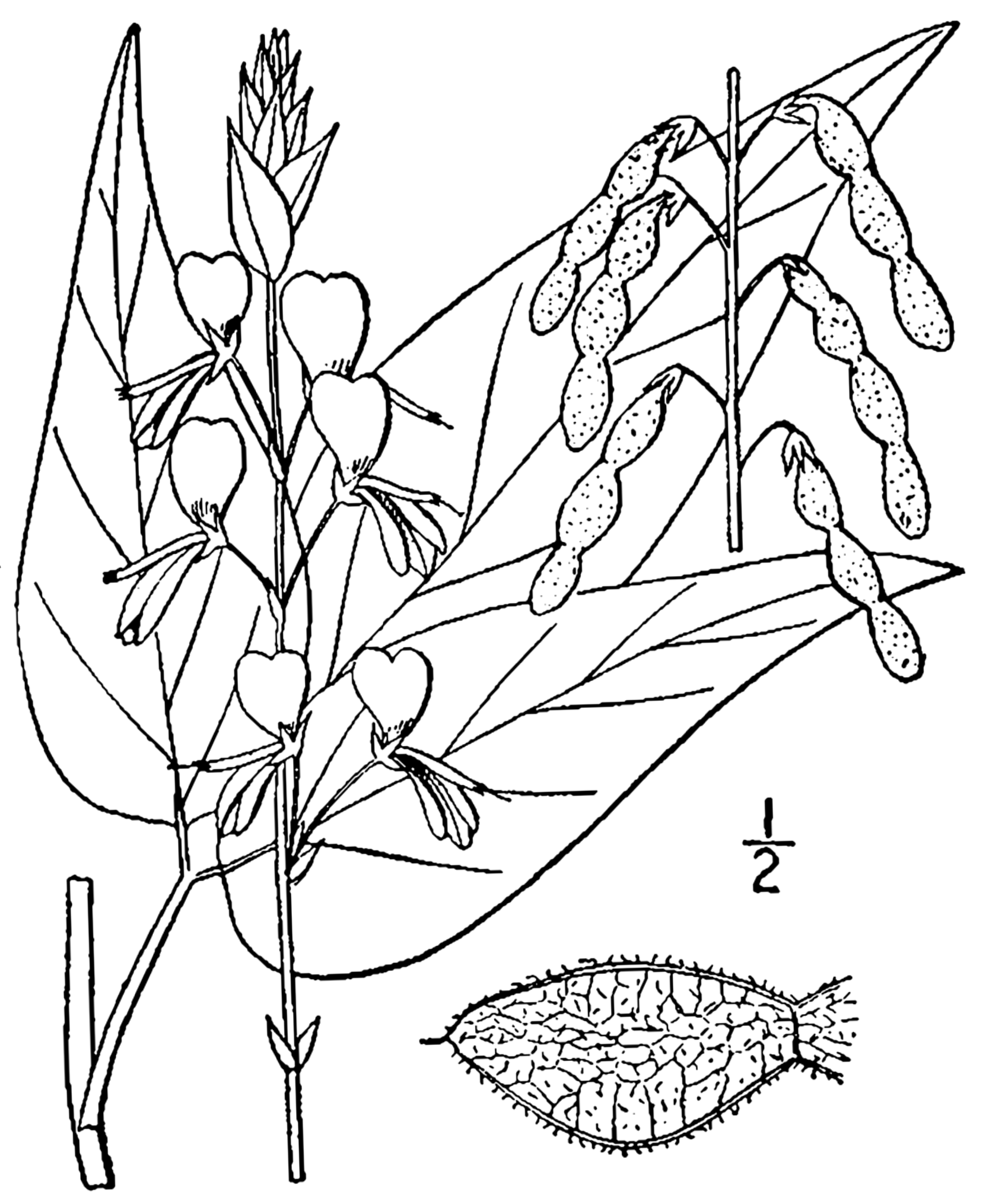
- Botanical illustration of Desmodium cuspidatum var. cuspidatum

Scientific classification
- Kingdom: Plantae
- Clade: Tracheophytes
- Clade: Angiosperms
- Clade: Eudicots
- Clade: Rosids
- Order: Fabales
- Family: Fabaceae
- Subfamily: Faboideae
- Genus: Desmodium
- Species: D. cuspidatum

Binomial name
- Desmodium cuspidatum (Muhl. ex Willd.) DC. ex D.Don

= Desmodium cuspidatum =

Species of legume

Desmodium cuspidatum, common name large-bracted tick-trefoil, is a species of plant in the legume family, Fabaceae. It is native to North America.

== Conservation status ==
The species is listed as endangered in Connecticut by state authorities. It is also endangered in Vermont and threatened in Massachusetts.

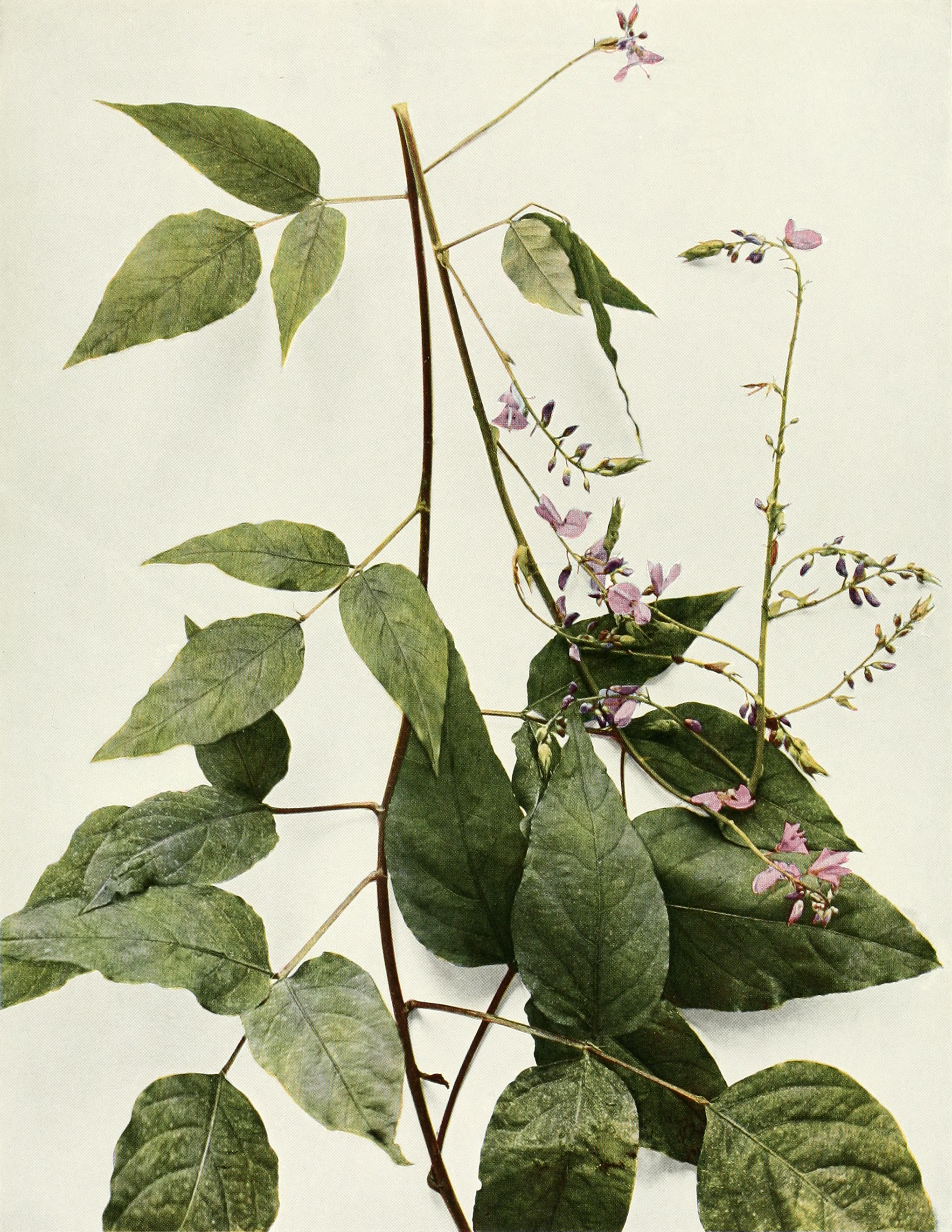
Desmodium cuspidatum
