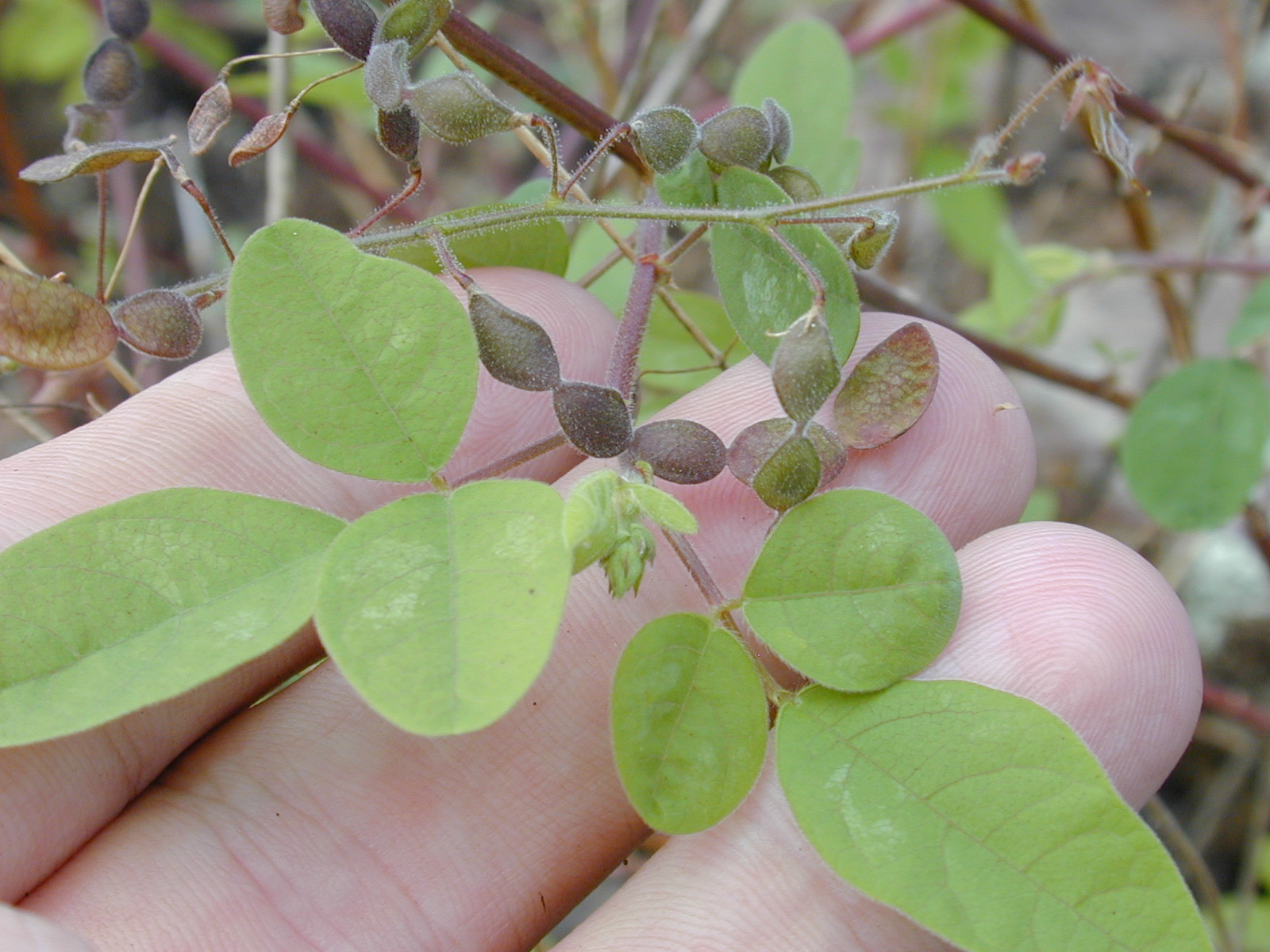
- Leaves and seedpods
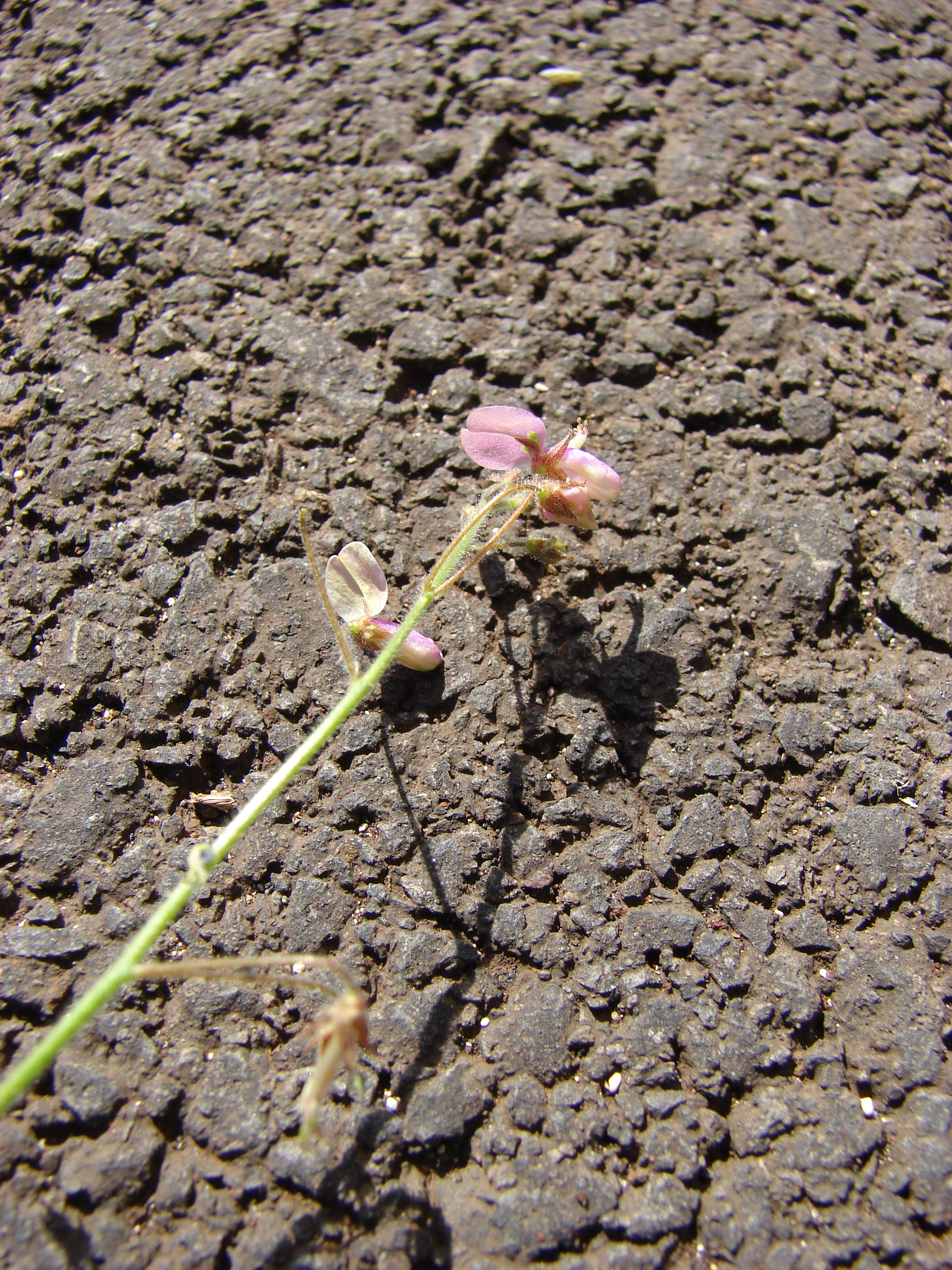
- Flower

Scientific classification
- Kingdom: Plantae
- Clade: Tracheophytes
- Clade: Angiosperms
- Clade: Eudicots
- Clade: Rosids
- Order: Fabales
- Family: Fabaceae
- Subfamily: Faboideae
- Genus: Desmodium
- Species: D. tortuosum

Binomial name
- Desmodium tortuosum (Sw.) DC.

Synonyms
- List: Desmodium physocarpos Vogel; Desmodium pulcherrimum Shuttlew. ex Griseb.; Desmodium purpureum (Mill.) Fawc. & Rendle; Desmodium stipulaceum DC.; Desmodium tortuosum var. hirtellum DC.; Hedysarum purpureum Mill.; Hedysarum stipulaceum Sessé ex DC.; Hedysarum tortuosum Sw.; Meibomia physocarpa (Vogel) Kuntze; Meibomia purpurea (Mill.) Vail; Meibomia stipulacea (DC.) Kuntze; Meibomia tortuosa (Sw.) Kuntze

= Desmodium tortuosum =

Species of plant in the legume family

Desmodium tortuosum, the twisted tick trefoil, dixie tick trefoil, tall tick clover, Florida beggarweed, and giant beggar weed, is a species of flowering plant in the family Fabaceae.

It is native to Latin America, and widely introduced as a forage to much of the rest of the world's subtropics and tropics. It's been observed growing in habitats such as beaches, along lake shores, and in floodplains. It can be found growing in sandy soil and full sun.
