= Leslie Pedley =

Australian botanist (1930–2018)

Leslie Pedley (19 May 1930 – 27 November 2018) was an Australian botanist who specialised in the genus Acacia. He is notable for bringing into use the generic name Racosperma, creating a split in the genus, which required some 900 Australian species to be renamed, because the type species of Acacia, Acacia nilotica, now Vachellia nilotica, had a different lineage from the Australian wattles. However, the International Botanical Congress (IBC), held in Melbourne in 2011, ratified its earlier decision to retain the name Acacia for the Australian species, but to rename the African species.

See also: Acacia and Vachellia nilotica regarding the dispute, and APNI for a brief history of the name, Racosperma.

In 2018, Japanese botanists Hiroyoshi Ohashi and Kazuaki K. Ohashi published Pedleya H.Ohashi & K.Ohashi (in the Fabaceae family) from New South Wales, the name "honors Mr. Les (Leslie) Pedley of Queensland Herbarium, Brisbane Botanic Gardens Mt Coot-tha, who revised Desmodieae of Sri Lanka and Australia".

The standard author abbreviation Pedley is used to indicate this person as the author when citing a botanical name.
