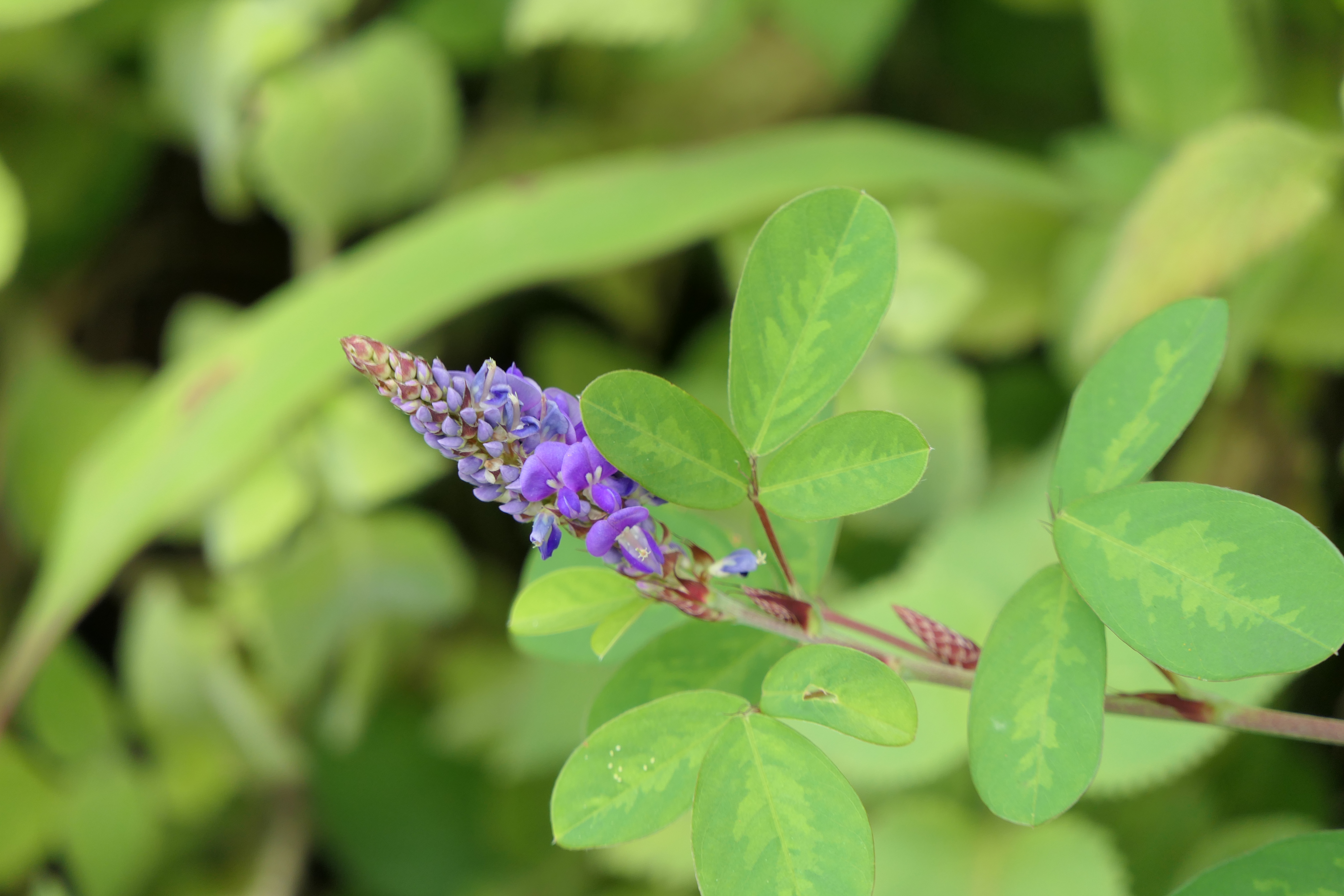

Scientific classification
- Kingdom: Plantae
- Clade: Embryophytes
- Clade: Tracheophytes
- Clade: Angiosperms
- Clade: Eudicots
- Clade: Rosids
- Order: Fabales
- Family: Fabaceae
- Subfamily: Faboideae
- Genus: Grona
- Species: G. heterocarpos

Binomial name
- Grona heterocarpos (L.) H.Ohashi & K.Ohashi

Synonyms
- Desmodium heterocarpon (L.) DC.; Hedysarum heterocarpon L. (1753); Meibomia heterocarpon (L.) Kuntze; Pleurolobus heterocarpon (L.) J.St.-Hil.

= Grona heterocarpos =

Species of plant

Grona heterocarpos is a species of shrub, also called Asian ticktrefoil, in the flowering plant family Fabaceae and genus Grona. It is native to tropical and subtropical regions across Asia and the West Pacific, as well as Tanzania. The plant is known for its aggressive, creeping growth and can reach heights of 0.5 to 1.5 meters. It produces pink to purplish-red pea-like flowers and is used in traditional medicine.

== Subdivisions ==
Three subdivisions are accepted.

- Grona heterocarpos var. gymnocarpa (Schindl.) H.Ohashi & K.Ohashi – southern India and Sri Lanka
- Grona heterocarpos subsp. heterocarpos Indian subcontinent to Japan, Australia, and the southwest Pacific.
- Grona heterocarpos var. strigosa (Meeuwen) H.Ohashi & K.Ohashi Tanzania, Nepal to Southern China and Sumatra, and New Guinea, Australia, and the southwest Pacific
