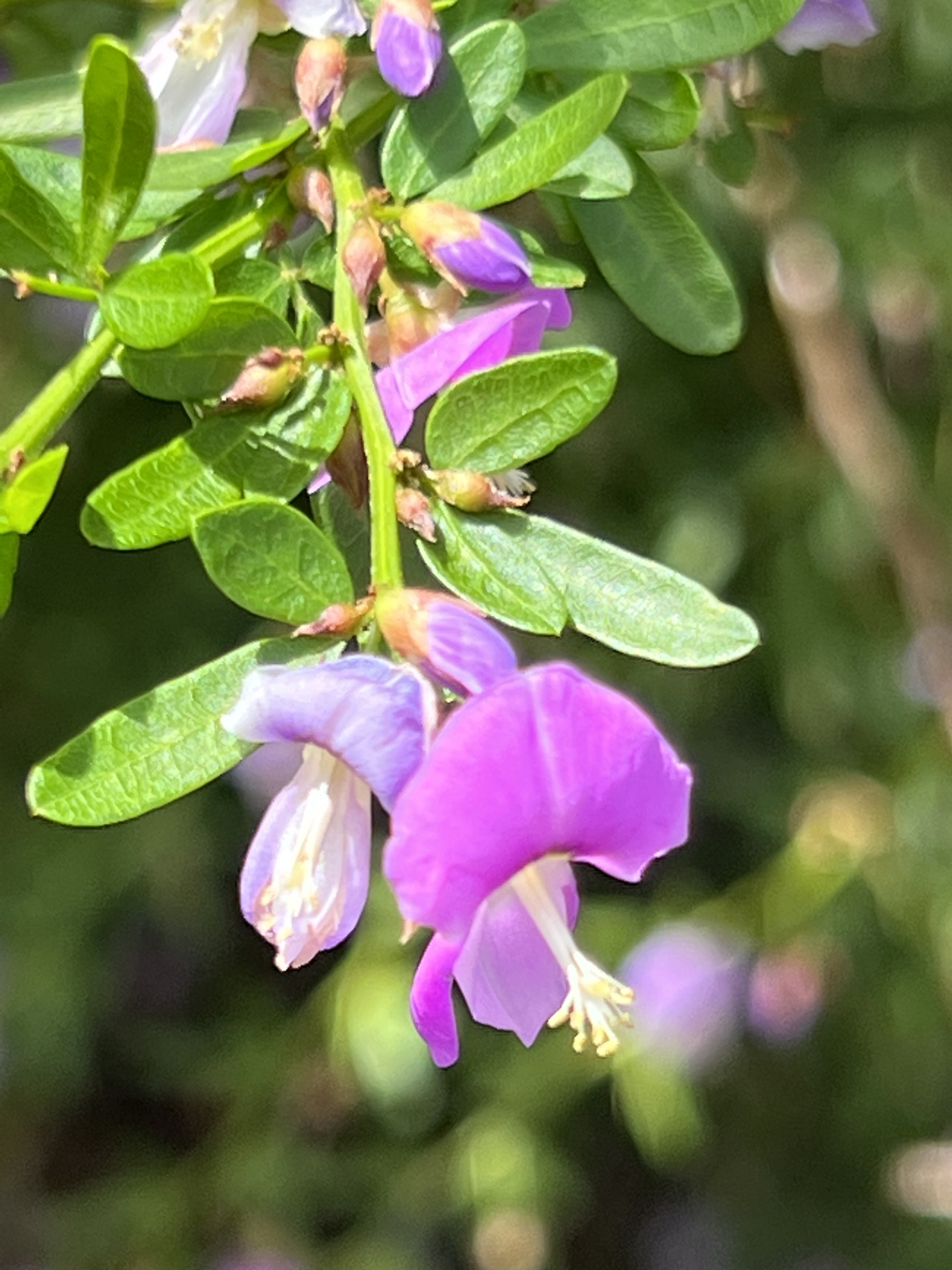
- In the Mount Annan Botanic Garden

Conservation status
- Vulnerable (EPBC Act)

Scientific classification
- Kingdom: Plantae
- Clade: Tracheophytes
- Clade: Angiosperms
- Clade: Eudicots
- Clade: Rosids
- Order: Fabales
- Family: Fabaceae
- Genus: Pedleya
- Species: P. acanthoclada

Binomial name
- Pedleya acanthoclada (F.Muell.) H.Ohashi & K.Ohashi

= Pedleya =

Thorny pea

Species of legume

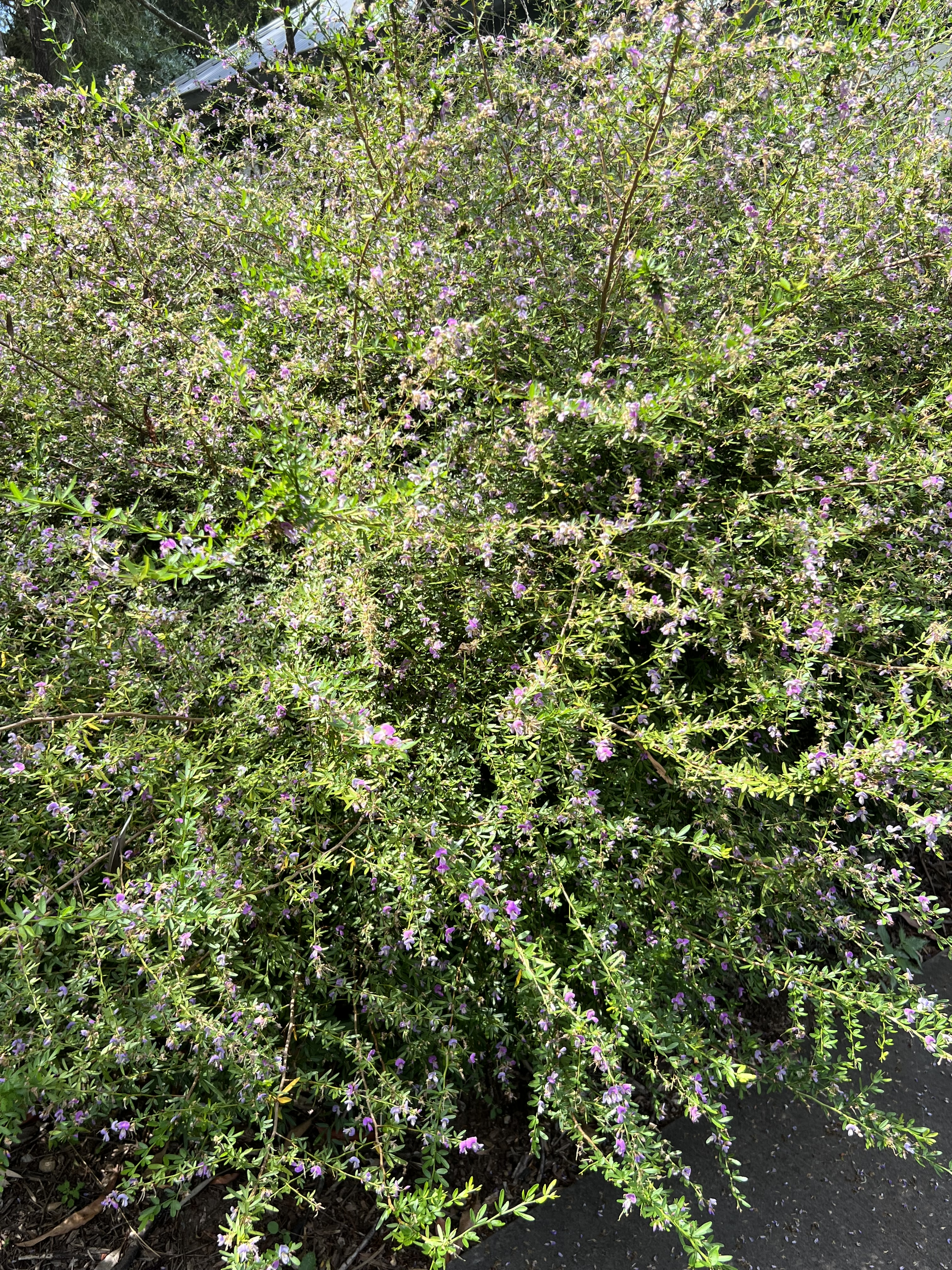
Habit

Pedleya acanthoclada, commonly known as thorny pea, is the only species of flowering plant in the genus Pedleya of the family Fabaceae. It is a small shrub with pink or purplish flowers, and leaves in groups of three.

== Description ==
Pedleya acanthoclada is a small shrub about 1 m (3 ft 3 in) high with stiff, smooth branches bearing thorns. The leaves are in groups of three and smooth, the middle leaf longer than lateral leaves, the apex rounded, the stipules about 1 mm (0.039 in) long and the petiole 2–4 mm (0.079–0.157 in) long. The pink to purple flowers are about 8 mm (0.31 in) long, in 1 or 2 pairs or clusters near the end of branches on a pedicel about 1 mm (0.039 in) long. Flowering occurs in summer and the fruit is a pod about 50 mm (2.0 in) long made up of 2-7 segments, each segment about 9–12 mm (0.35–0.47 in) long.

== Taxonomy and naming ==
Pedleya acanthoclada was first formally described in 1861 by Ferdinand von Mueller, who gave it the name Desmodium acanthocladum in his Fragmenta Phytographiae Australiae, from specimens collected near the Clarence River by Hermann Beckler. In 2018, Hiroyoshi Ohashi and Kazuaki Ohashi transferred the species to Pedleya in the Journal of Japanese Botany. The genus name honours Leslie Pedley, (1930–2018), who was an Australian botanist who specialised in the genus Acacia. The specific epithet (acanthoclada) means "spiny shoot".

== Distribution and habitat ==
Thorny pea is found growing mostly near rivers in the Lismore and Grafton regions of New South Wales.

== Conservation status ==
This species of pea (as Desmodium acanthocladum) is listed as "vulnerable" under the Australian Government Environment Protection and Biodiversity Conservation Act 1999 and the New South Wales Government Biodiversity Conservation Act 2016. The main threats to the species include habitat fragmentation, damage cause by roadworks, trampling by livestock and weed infestation.
