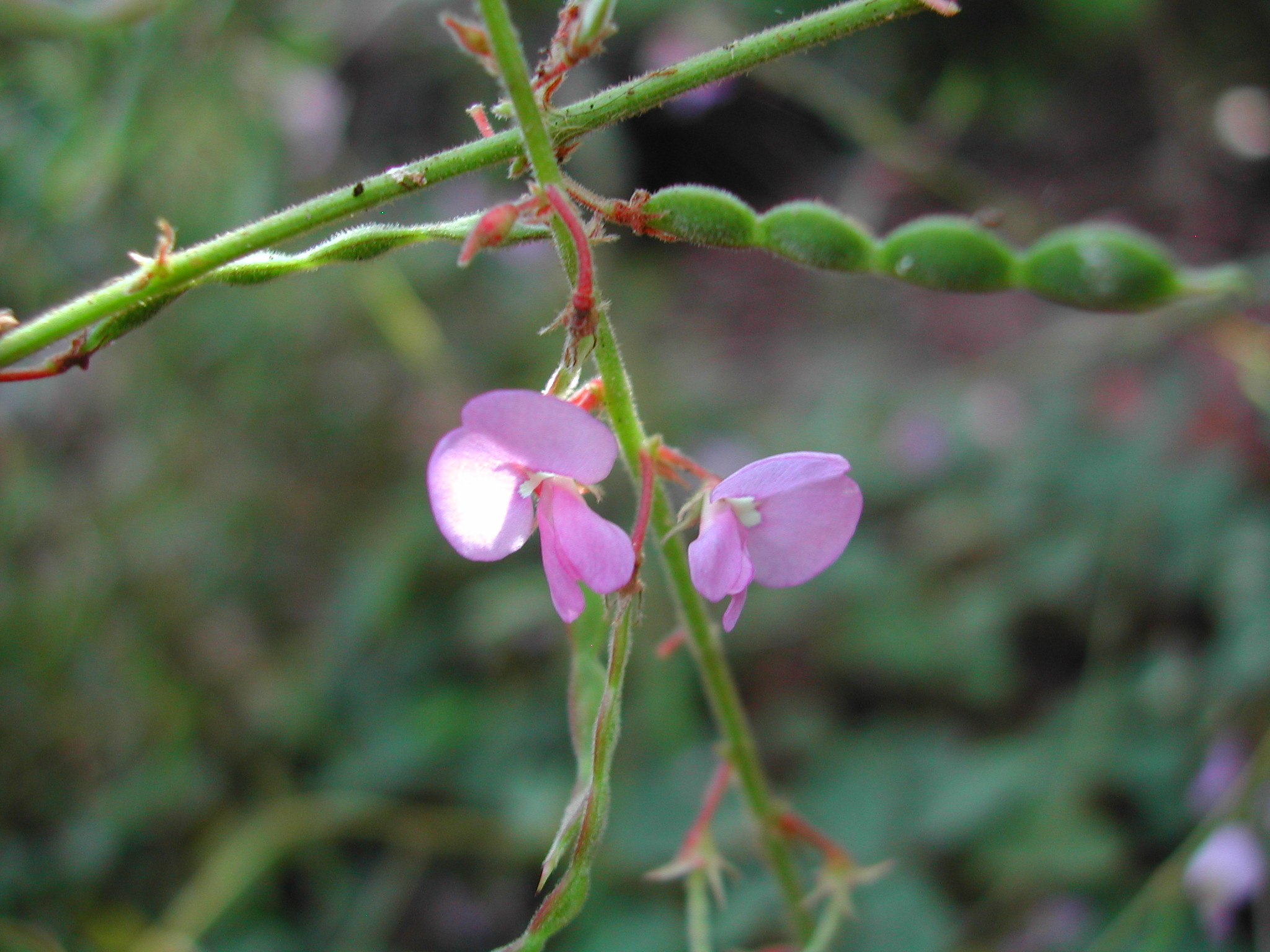

Scientific classification
- Kingdom: Plantae
- Clade: Embryophytes
- Clade: Tracheophytes
- Clade: Spermatophytes
- Clade: Angiosperms
- Clade: Eudicots
- Clade: Rosids
- Order: Fabales
- Family: Fabaceae
- Subfamily: Faboideae
- Genus: Maekawaea
- Species: M. rhytidophylla

Binomial name
- Maekawaea rhytidophylla (F.Muell. ex Benth.) H.Ohashi & K.Ohashi (2020)

Synonyms
- Desmodium rhytidophyllum F.Muell. ex Benth. (1864); Meibomia rhytidophylla Kuntze (1891)

= Maekawaea rhytidophylla =

Species of legume

Maekawaea rhytidophylla is a small twining herb or trailing shrub in the family Fabaceae. The plant has rusty or felty hairs on all parts. Attractive pink flowers may form at any time of the year. It is native to eastern and northern Australia (Northern Territory, Queensland, and New South Wales) and to New Guinea and New Caledonia.

The specific epithet rhytidophylla is derived from Greek, describing the wrinkled leaves.
