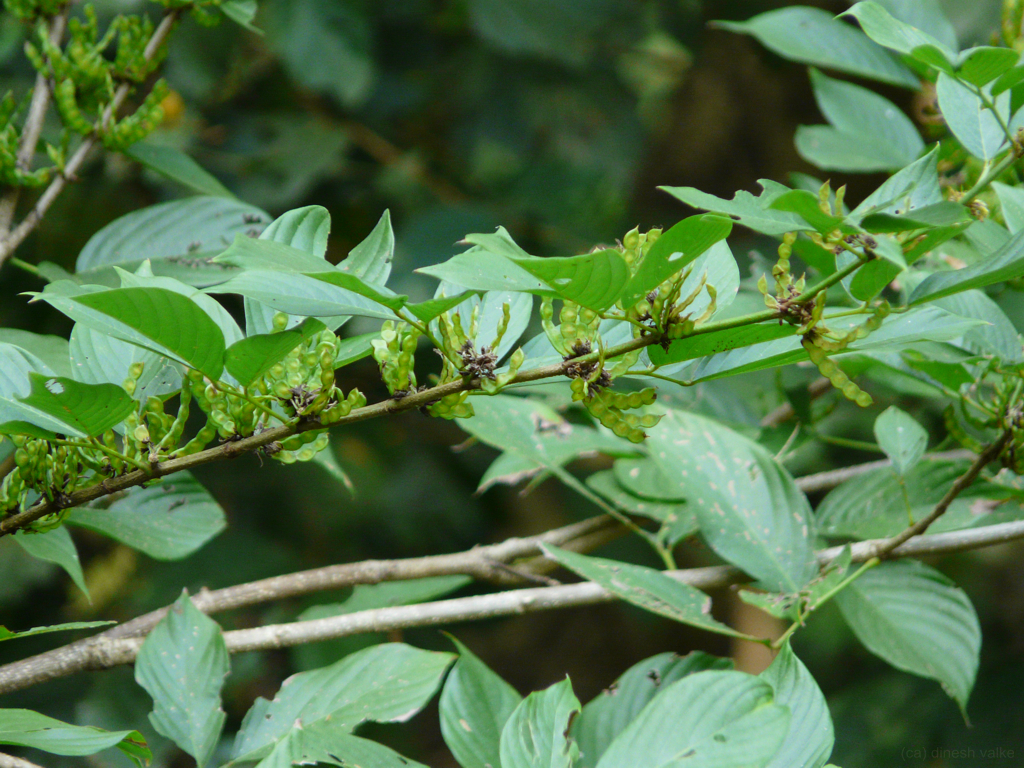

Scientific classification
- Kingdom: Plantae
- Clade: Tracheophytes
- Clade: Angiosperms
- Clade: Eudicots
- Clade: Rosids
- Order: Fabales
- Family: Fabaceae
- Subfamily: Faboideae
- Genus: Dendrolobium
- Species: D. triangulare

Binomial name
- Dendrolobium triangulare Muell.Arg.

Synonyms
- Dendrolobium triangulare subsp. triangulare; Desmodium australe Hassk.; Desmodium cephalotes (Roxb.) Wight & Arn.; Desmodium cephalotes (Roxb.) Benth.; Desmodium congestum Wight & Arn.; Desmodium lineatum Span.; Desmodium paleaceum sensu auct.; Desmodium recurvatum sensu Benth. Misapplied; Desmodium sericatum C.Presl; Desmodium triangulare (Retz.) Merr.; Desmodium umbellatum Moritz.; Hedysarum cephalotes Roxb.; Hedysarum triangulare Retz.; Hedysarum umbellatum Roxb.; Meibomia cephalotes (Roxb.) Kuntze

= Dendrolobium triangulare =

Species of legume

Dendrolobium triangulare is a species of flowering plants in the legume family, Fabaceae. It is found in Taiwan, China, Cambodia, India, Laos, Malaysia, Myanmar, Nepal, Sri Lanka, Thailand, Vietnam and few African countries. Leaves are trifoliate, where blade narrowly obovo-elliptic. Flowers white or pale yellow. Seed elliptic. Roots of the plant are widely used for medicinal purposes to strengthen bones and build muscle.
