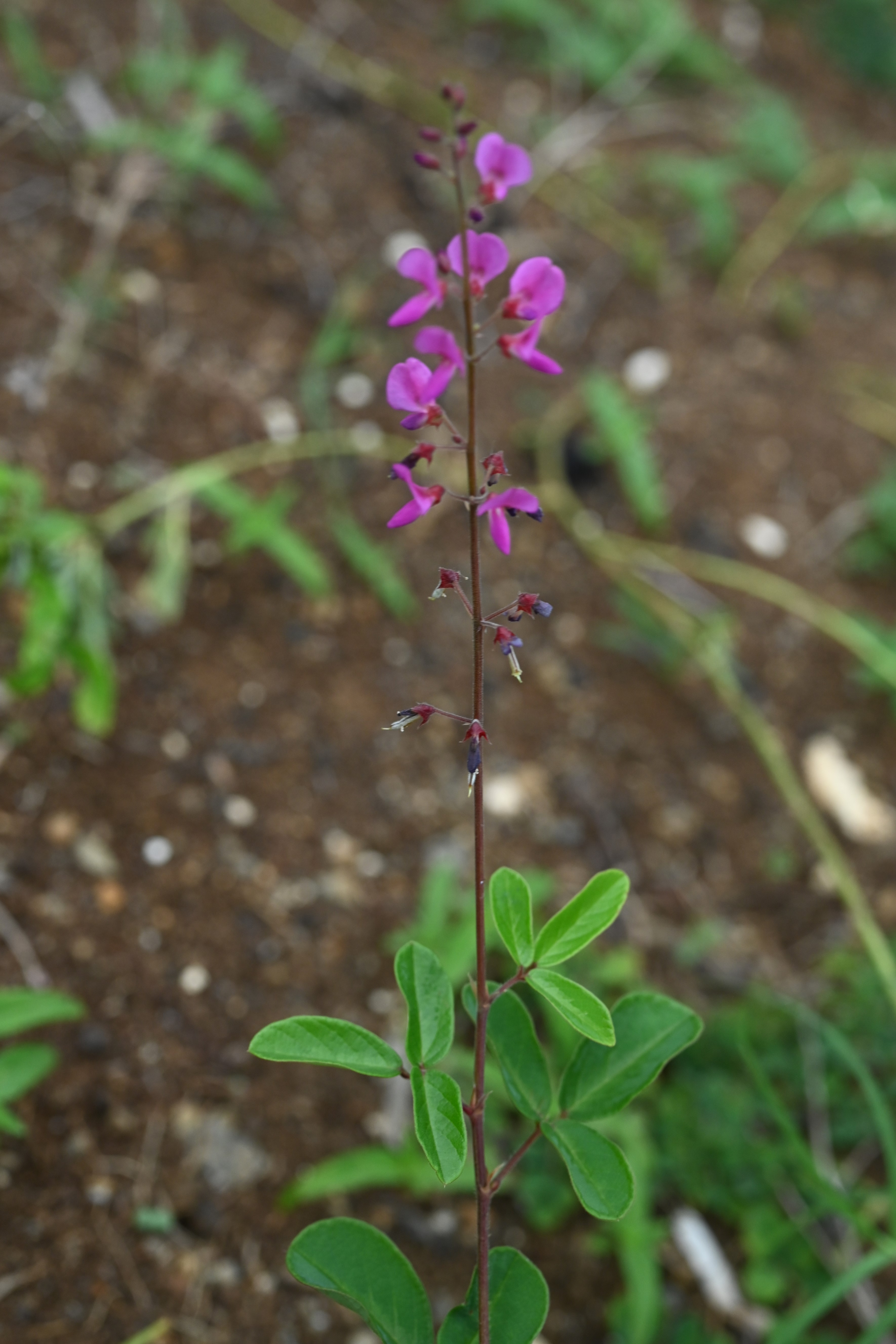

Conservation status
- Least Concern (IUCN 3.1)

Scientific classification
- Kingdom: Plantae
- Clade: Embryophytes
- Clade: Tracheophytes
- Clade: Angiosperms
- Clade: Eudicots
- Clade: Rosids
- Order: Fabales
- Family: Fabaceae
- Subfamily: Faboideae
- Genus: Grona
- Species: G. adscendens

Binomial name
- Grona adscendens (Sw.) H.Ohashi & K.Ohashi

Synonyms
- List: Desmodium adscendens (Sw.) DC.; Desmodium adscendens f. glabrescens Schindl.; Desmodium adscendens var. robustum B.G.Schub.; Desmodium adscendens var. trifoliastrum (Miq.) Schindl.; Desmodium arinense Hoehne; Desmodium caespitosum (Poir.) DC.; Desmodium coeruleum G.Don; Desmodium ellipticum Macfad.; Desmodium glaucescens Miq.; Desmodium obovatum Vogel; Desmodium ovalifolium Guill. & Perr.; Desmodium oxalidifolium Blume ex Miq.; Desmodium oxalidifolium G.Don; Desmodium racemiferum DC.; Desmodium simplex G.Don; Desmodium thwaitesii Baker; Desmodium trifoliastrum Miq.; Desmodium vogelii Steud.; Grona adscendens var. robusta (B.G.Schub.) H.Ohashi & K.Ohashi; Hedysarum adscendens Sw.; Hedysarum ascendens Lindl.; Hedysarum caespitosum Poir.; Hedysarum lindleyi Mart.; Meibomia adscendens (Sw.) Kuntze; Meibomia adscendens var. obovata (Vogel) Kuntze; Meibomia racemifera (DC.) Kuntze; Meibomia thwaitesii (Baker) Kuntze; Meibomia trifoliastra (Miq.) Kuntze

= Grona adscendens =

Species of plant

Grona adscendens, the wild groundnut, is a species of flowering plant in the family Fabaceae. It is native to the seasonally dry tropics of the Americas and Africa, and it has been introduced to India, Southeast Asia, Malesia, New Guinea, and many Pacific islands. A non-climbing perennial shrub, it is found in a variety of habitats including forests, grasslands, and farm fields. Under its synonym Desmodium adscendens it has been assessed as Least Concern. Large-scale, randomized, placebo-controlled studies to justify its use in humans have not yet been performed.
