= Chilo partellus =

Scientific classification
- Kingdom: Animalia
- Phylum: Arthropoda
- Clade: Pancrustacea
- Class: Insecta
- Order: Lepidoptera
- Family: Crambidae
- Genus: Chilo
- Species: C. partellus

Binomial name
- Chilo partellus (C. Swinhoe, 1885)

Synonyms
- Crambus partellus C. Swinhoe, 1885; Chilo partellus acutus Bhattacherjee, 1971; Chilo lutulentalis Tams, 1932; Chilo partellus coimbatorensis Bhattacherjee, 1971; Chilo partellus kanpurensis Bhattacherjee, 1971; Chilo kaanpurense Vári, Kroon & Krüger, 2002; Crambus zonellus C. Swinhoe, 1884

Species of moth

Chilo partellus, the spotted stalk borer or spotted stem borer, is a moth in the family Crambidae. It was described by Charles Swinhoe in 1885. It is found in India, Pakistan, Iran, Ethiopia, Lesotho, Madagascar, Malawi, South Africa, Sudan, Tanzania, Uganda and on Mayotte.

C. partellus is a pest that was introduced to Africa most likely from India in the early 20th century. After arriving in Africa, it has spread to nearly all countries in eastern and southern Africa, and it is assumed that it is spreading to western Africa. C. partellus is indigenous to Asia and became established in eastern Africa in the early 1930s.

C. partellus is one of the most economically damaging pests in Asia and Africa, attacking all parts of the plant except the roots.

== Habitat ==
C. partellus has rapidly spread over a wide geographical range and has proven to be a very efficient colonizer and devastating pest wherever it may occur. In general, C. partellus occurs in low to mid-elevations (less than 1500 m) and warmer areas. However, they can now be found in higher elevations such as Ethiopia at 2088 m.

C. partellus is highly invasive and can fully or partially displace other indigenous stemborer species such as Busseola fusca and Chilo orichalcociliellus. Temperature and humidity can have a significant impact on the survival and establishment of adult C. partellus in new ecological niches.

== Food ==
C. partellus is a generalist herbivore that feeds on several species of cultivated and wild plants.

== Appearance ==
Eggs are flat and oval and look creamy white and are about 0.8 mm in length.

Larvae of C. partellus resemble caterpillars and can be creamy white to yellowish brown. These larvae also have four purple-brown longitudinal stripes and are usually found with characteristically dark brown spots along the back, therefore giving off a spotted appearance. When the larvae of the spotted stalk borer are fully grown, they produce a conspicuous reddish-brown head. It has a plate on the dorsal surface of the thorax which is known as a prothoracic shield and is reddish brown to dark brown and shiny.

Pupae can be up to 15 mm in length, slender and shiny. The pupae of C. partellus are light yellow brown to dark red brown.

Adults are small moths with wing lengths ranging from 7–17 mm and a wingspan of 20–25 mm. The forewings of adults are brown yellowish with darker scale patterns forming longitudinal stripes. The hindwings of males are a pale straw colour and in females the hindwings are white.

Similar species such as Chilo orichalcociliellus located in East Africa may be confused with Chilo partellus.

== Reproduction and life cycle ==
Eggs are laid in batches of 10–80 on the upperside and underside of leaf surfaces, usually close to the midrib. They hatch after 4–10 days.

Younger larvae (caterpillars) feed on the leaf whorl. Older larvae tunnel into the stems, and it is within these tunnels that they feed and grow for about 2–3 weeks. When these larvae grow completely, they pupate and remain in the stem of the maize. After 1–2 weeks, the adults evolve from the pupae stage and emerge from the stem. They mate and lay eggs on other maize plants and continue to cause damage to the crop.

During dry seasons, larvae may enter a state of diapause or a period suspended development for several months and will pupate once it the dry season is over and there is rain. Adults can emerge from pupae in the late afternoon or early evenings and are active at night. Adults will rest on plants during the day. The whole life cycle takes about 3–4 weeks, however it can vary due to temperature, humidity and other factors. Five or more successive generations may develop in favourable conditions and in regions where there is warm temperatures, high relative humidity, sufficient water and an abundance of host plants. C. partellus can reproduce and develop all year-round.

== Host relationship ==
This pest causes US$334 million annual loss to sorghum alone in the semiarid tropics.

C. partellus attacks several grass species which can be both cultivated and wild. Cultivated crop hosts include but are not limited to maize, sorghum, pearl millet, rice, and sugarcane. Wild hosts include elephant grass (Pennisetum purpureum), reeds (Phragmites) and vossia (Vossia cuspidata).

In nature, an insect locates a host plant through a sequence of behavioural and biological responses such as the following:

1. Orientation and setting
2. Feeding
3. Metabolism of ingested food
4. Growth
5. Survival and fecundity
6. Oviposition

If one or more of these categories of insect responses are not met by the host plant, the plant would therefore be rendered as unsuitable or unfavourable for insect establishment. Therefore, the extent of insect establishment depends on the interaction of insect responses to various plant characteristics.

Numerous factors can enhance the insect pest problem, this includes either manipulating the environment that are favourable for growth, reproduction and development of insects. Processes that could decrease the insect pest problem include unrestricted use of chemicals (insecticides) and imbalanced use of fertilizers.

Infestation can start around two weeks after seedling emergence. The first symptom of damage is the presence of irregular shaped pinholes or shot holes caused by early-instar larval feeding in the whorl. This can later convert to elongated lesions on the leaves. The infested plants appear ragged and deteriorated. The older larvae leave the whorl, break through and bore into the stem and reach the growing point. It is there that the larvae cut and cause the characteristic deadheart symptom.

Therefore, the damage due to the pest includes leaf feeding and subsequent destruction, extensive tunnels in stems and maize cobs, disruption in the nutrient flow, and the resultant death of the plant due to the puncture of the growing point.

== Host defences ==
Studies have shown that some host plants to C. partellus have developed defences and therefore resistance to this pest. For example, some maize landraces have been shown to respond to early herbivory (e.g. egg deposition) by C. partellus by producing herbivore-induced plant volatiles (HIPVs) which would attract parasitoids of C. partellus. It is assumed that this is an opportunity for the exploitation of this trait and can be used as management of this pest. However, this particular defensive technique requires further study for it have very little to no information available regarding other factors including host plant defences on larval preference and development, C. partellus's oviposition behaviour after HIPV production, etc. Also, host plants may have created a defence where leaf feeding by C. partellus may have induced secondary defence metabolites making plants unpalatable. Therefore, this could represent another opportunity for the management of C. partellus.

== Pest management and biocontrol methods ==
There are a few methods that could be used in order to reduce the pest population of C. partellus. Methods and processes include but are not limited to the following:

Detection methods: Infestations by C. partellus can be detected by walking through crops looking for the characteristic physical appearance of a deteriorated host plant by the presence of deadhearts. Samples of infested stems can be cut open to find caterpillars and pupae, however it is a good idea to rear these until adulthood to be certain that they are C. partellus pests.

Cultural practices: Intercropping or mixing maize with non-host crops like cassava can reduce the population of C. partellus. Trap plants such as Napier grass (Pennisetum purpureum) may also be used. These plants draw the adult female away from the crop and more eggs are laid on the trap plant than on the host plant crop, and this leads to poor development of larvae. This method is also known as "push-pull".

Also, marking sure to destroy all residue of infested maize to ensure the death of all larvae would decrease the chances of reinfestation.

Biological control: Two parasitic wasps (Cotesia flavipes) and (Xanthopimpla stemmator) can attack and kill C. partellus pests. These parasitic wasps can lay eggs into C. partellus (C. flavipes on adult and X. stemmator on the pupae) and upon hatching, these eggs feed internally into the pest. They then exit and spin cocoons. Therefore, management of habitats that conserve these parasitic wasps could also result in the decline of C. partellus populations.

Chemical control: Applications of granules or dust to the leaf whorl early in crop growth could kill early larval instars. However this has limited effectiveness, especially once the larvae has bored into the stem. Also, studies indicate that nitrogen fertilizer can be applied as an integrated pest management tactic in control of C. partellus population development and infestation on maize crop.

== Human impact ==
Climate change could be one of the possible reasons this pest is moving to higher altitudes and therefore increasing its geographic range. This is due to a study showing that temperature, relative humidity, and interaction significantly affect the developmental time of C. partellus.

A study found that the egg period was longer at lower temperatures for C. partellus, therefore there is a reduction in larval period with an increase in temperature due to increased metabolic activity and feeding. Also, the pupal period was shorter at higher temperatures, therefore higher temperatures have a significantly shorter egg to adult developmental period. Egg hatching was faster at higher relative humidity, therefore this study and its results imply that high relative humidity modifies the effect of temperature and contributes to the variation in the egg period of C. partellus. In addition, higher temperatures also indicated a reduction in the length of their life cycle, a reduced developmental time and an increase in developmental rates. Therefore, the duration of adult longevity of this pest is inversely related to temperature.
