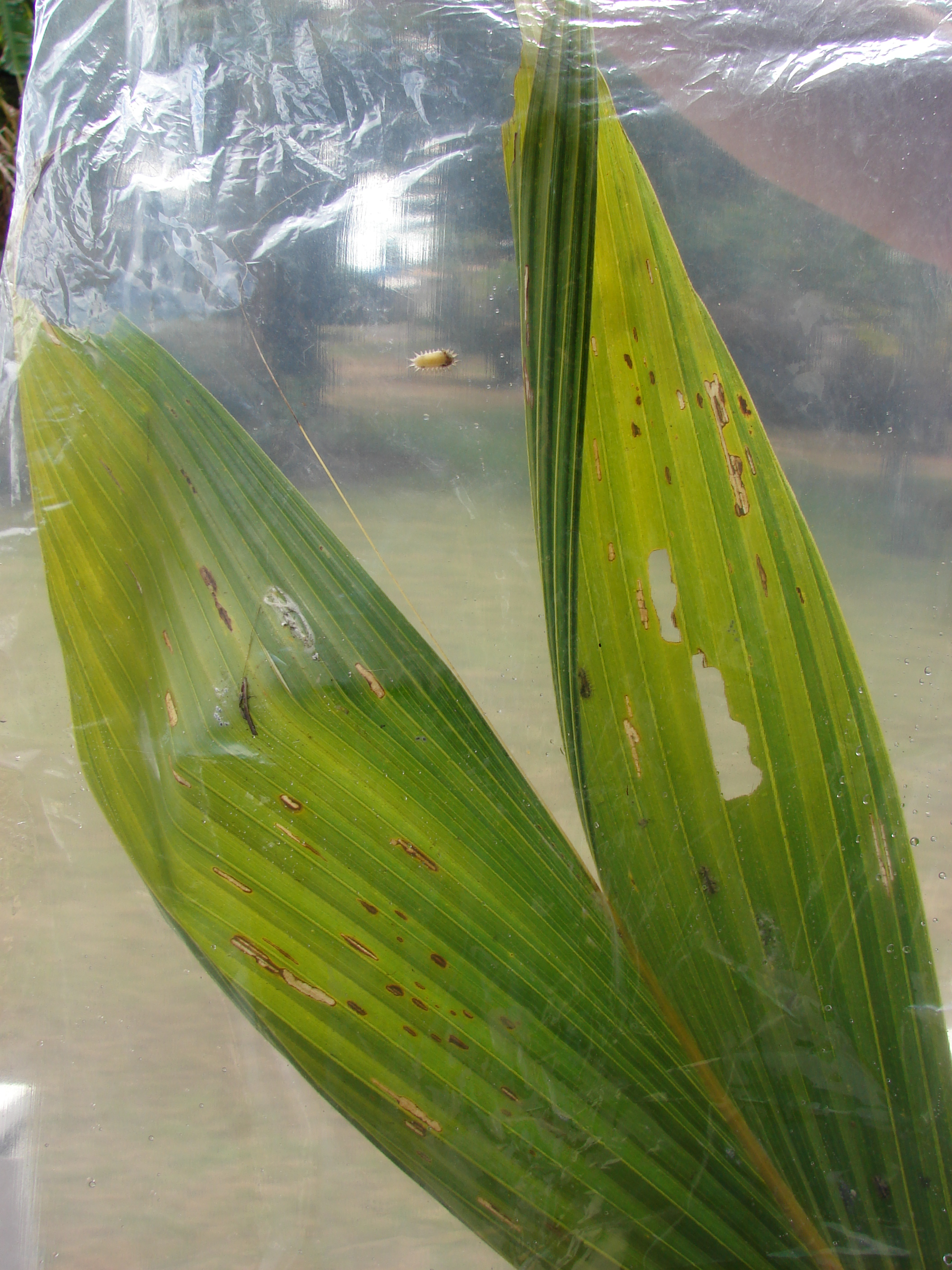
- Damage to Cocos nucifera

Scientific classification
- Domain: Eukaryota
- Kingdom: Animalia
- Phylum: Arthropoda
- Class: Insecta
- Order: Lepidoptera
- Family: Limacodidae
- Genus: Darna
- Species: D. pallivitta

Binomial name
- Darna pallivitta (Moore, 1877)

Synonyms
- Miresa pallivitta Moore, 1877

= Darna pallivitta =

Species of moth

Darna pallivitta, the nettle caterpillar or stinging nettle caterpillar, is a moth of the genus Darna and family Limacodidae. It is native to China, Taiwan, Thailand, Peninsular Malaysia, Java and Borneo. It was introduced to Hawaii in 2001.

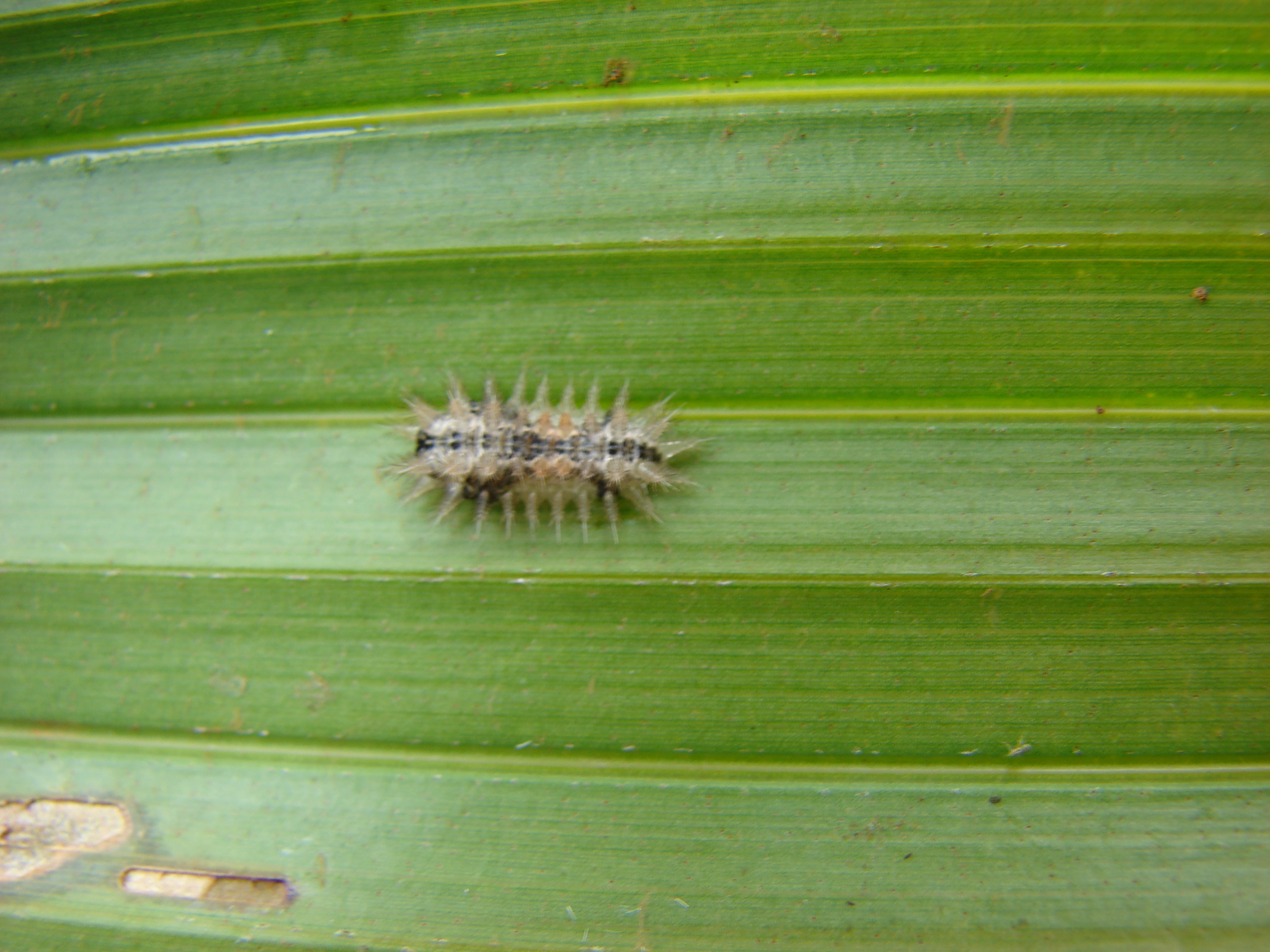

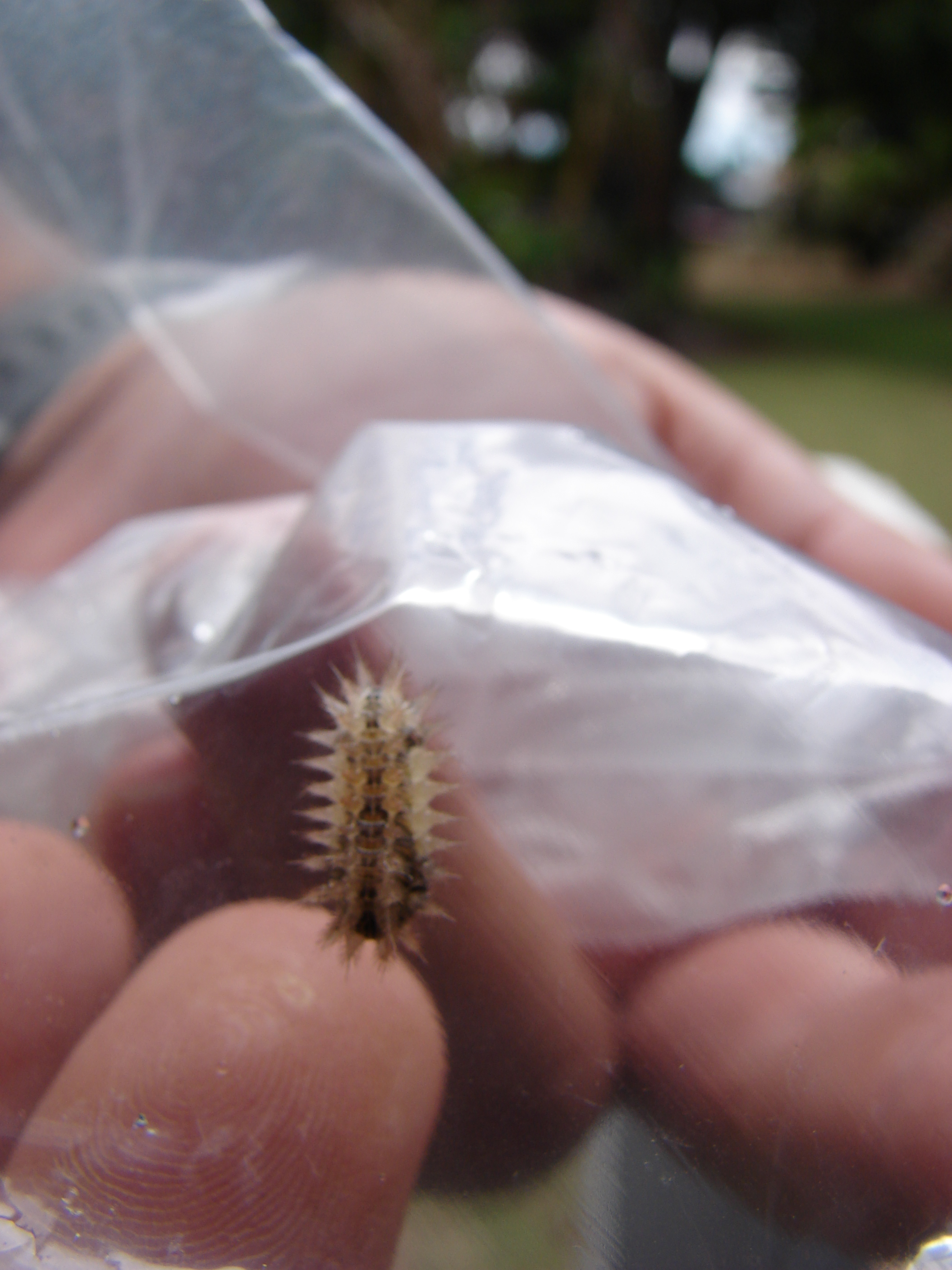

== Food ==
The larvae feed on the leaves of a wide range of plants, including:

- Areca
- Caryota
- Cocos
- Phoenix
- Rhapsis
- Veitchia merrillii
- Adenostemma
- Commelina diffusa
- Breynia
- Vigna marina
- Cordyline terminalis
- Dracaena
- Iris
- Ficus
- Averrhoa carambola
- Coffea arabica
- Pipturus albidus
- Alyxia oliviformis
- Monstera
- Neodypsis decaryi
- Wedelia
- Tillandsia cyanea
- Desmodium uncinatum
- Erythrina sandwicensis
- Cuphea
- Beaucarnea recurvata
- Cordyline marginata
- Ophiopogon
- Clidemia hirta
- Tibouchina
- Musa
- Psidium
- Jasminum multiflorum
- Arundina graminifolia
- Panicum repens
- Paspalum conjugatum
- Pennisetum purpureum
- Macadamia and Gardenia

When larvae are ready to pupate, they migrate to protected areas of the host and pupate in clusters. The pupal stage lasts for 17–21 days.
