= Hellinsia lacteodactylus =

Scientific classification
- Kingdom: Animalia
- Phylum: Arthropoda
- Clade: Pancrustacea
- Class: Insecta
- Order: Lepidoptera
- Family: Pterophoridae
- Genus: Hellinsia
- Species: H. lacteodactylus

Binomial name
- Hellinsia lacteodactylus (Chambers, 1873)

Synonyms
- Pterophorus lacteodactylus Chambers, 1873; Oidaematophorus lacteodactylus

Species of plume moth

Hellinsia lacteodactylus is a moth of the family Pterophoridae described by Vactor Tousey Chambers in 1873. It is found in North America, including Florida, Mississippi, Kentucky, North Carolina, Colorado, Nova Scotia and British Columbia.

The wingspan is 25–29 mm. Adults are on wing from May to July.

The larvae feed on Solidago species and Eupatorium perfoliatum. They are stemborers.
