= Hellinsia glenni =

Scientific classification
- Kingdom: Animalia
- Phylum: Arthropoda
- Class: Insecta
- Order: Lepidoptera
- Family: Pterophoridae
- Genus: Hellinsia
- Species: H. glenni

Binomial name
- Hellinsia glenni (Cashatt, 1972)

Synonyms
- Oidaematophorus glenni Cashatt, 1972

Species of plume moth

Hellinsia glenni is a moth of the family Pterophoridae described by Everett D. Cashatt in 1972. It is found in North America, including Florida, Mississippi and California.

The wingspan is about 26 millimetres (1.0 in).

The larvae feed on Solidago canadensis. They are stemborers.
