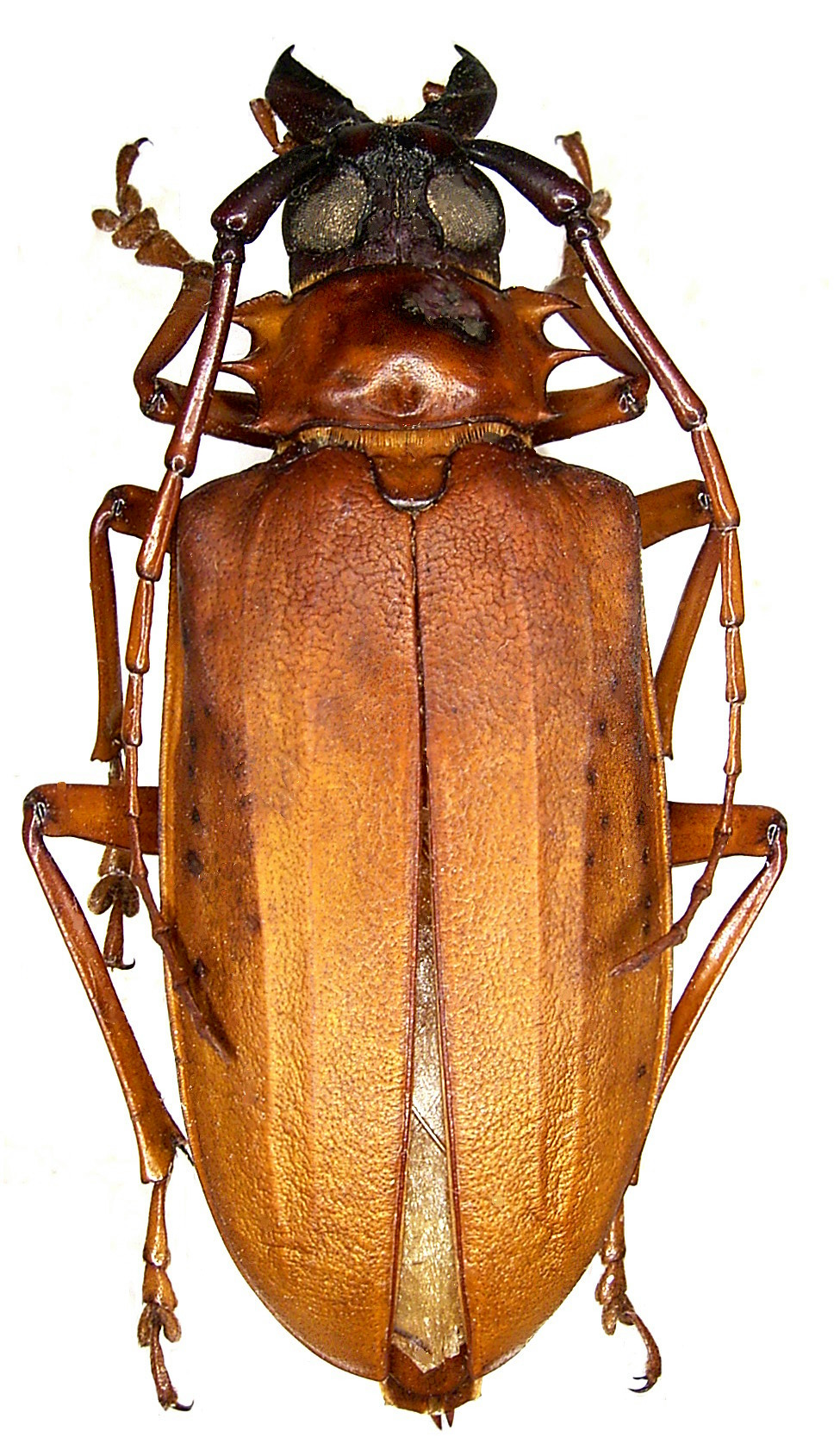

Scientific classification
- Kingdom: Animalia
- Phylum: Arthropoda
- Class: Insecta
- Order: Coleoptera
- Suborder: Polyphaga
- Infraorder: Cucujiformia
- Family: Cerambycidae
- Subfamily: Prioninae
- Tribe: Prionini
- Genus: Dorysthenes
- Species: D. dentipes

Binomial name
- Dorysthenes dentipes (Fairmaire, 1902)

= Dorysthenes dentipes =

Species of beetle

Dorysthenes dentipes is a species of beetle from the long horned-beetle family Cerambycidae. It is found throughout Vietnam, China, and Laos. The beetles can grow up to 46 millimeters long. The scientific name of the species was first published in 1902 by Faimraire.
