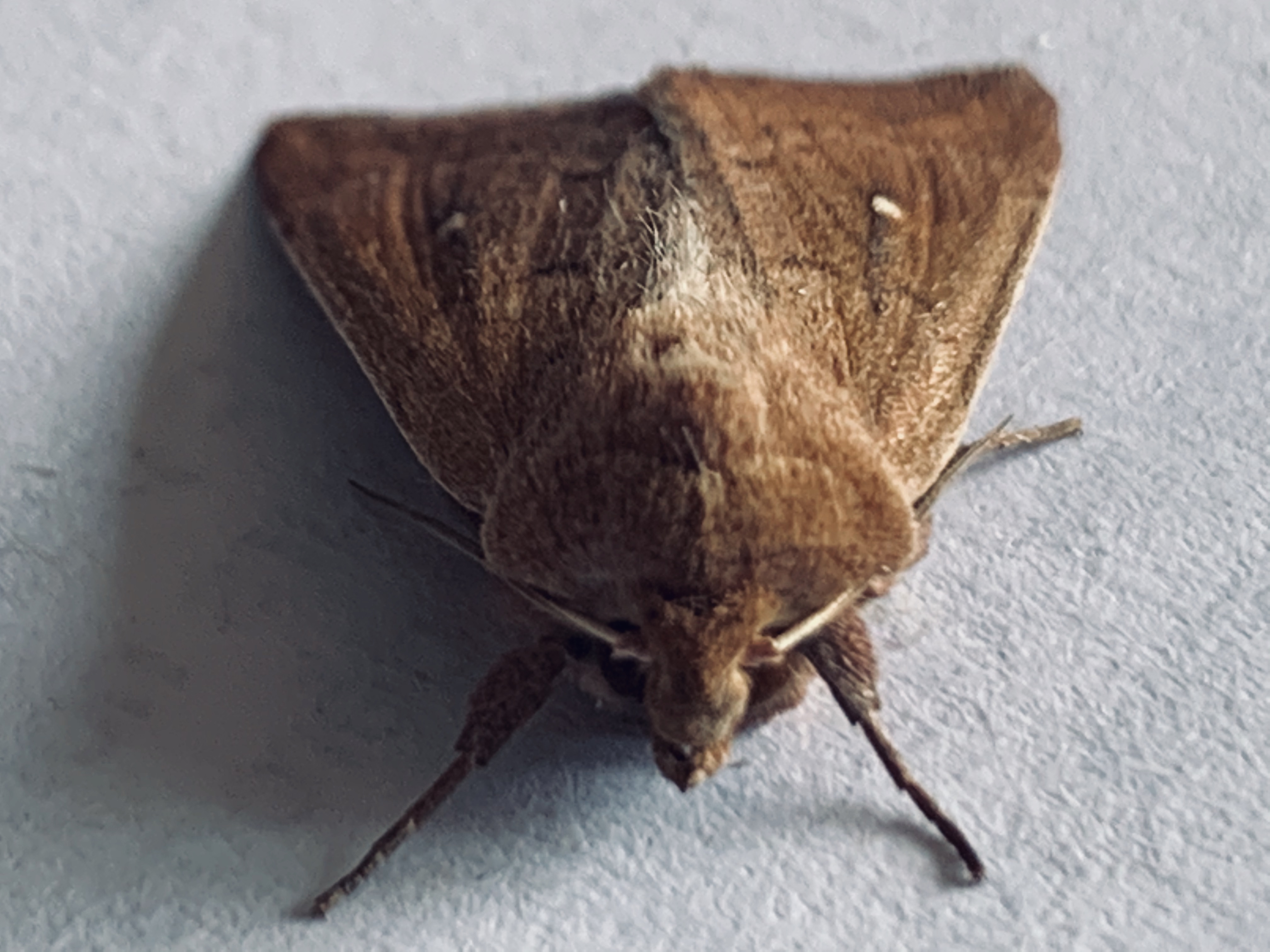

Scientific classification
- Domain: Eukaryota
- Kingdom: Animalia
- Phylum: Arthropoda
- Class: Insecta
- Order: Lepidoptera
- Superfamily: Noctuoidea
- Family: Noctuidae
- Genus: Busseola
- Species: B. fusca

Binomial name
- Busseola fusca (Fuller, 1901)

= Busseola fusca =

Species of moth

Busseola fusca is a species of moth that is also known as the maize stalk borer. It is known from Ethiopia.

The wingspan is 35–40 mm. Adults are pale brown.

The caterpillars are light or dark violet to pinkish white and about 1 to 2 ½ cm. The caterpillars feed in the leaf hearts (leaf funnels) at the vegetative crop stage. The damage is visible as yellowish and dying leaf hearts. Later, larvae bore into the stems. The boring tunnels are seen when you slice the stems. Later, stalk borers also tunnel into grains.

The caterpillar feeding kills the growing points of the plant. Caterpillars also carry Fusarium fungi to the cobs, which can produce mycotoxins. If not controlled, stalk borers cause yield loss between 20 - 100% in maize.

The larvae feed on various grasses, as well as Zea mays, Sorghum and Saccharum species.

== Symptoms ==
Small holes or 'windows' in straight lines across the newest leaves of maize or sorghum. Eggs are found on the underside of the leaf; they are ~ 1mm creamy white/yellowish in colour which may darken as the develop. As the infestation develops symptoms include: weak stems, damage to growing parts, prevention of flowering and dead hearts.

Stalk borers make a hole into the stem and feed inside these stems, which disrupts nutrient and water flow in the plant. The plants become stunted and produce maize cobs that are up to 30% smaller.

== Management ==
=== Prevention ===
Planting early can avoid serious infestation and application of nitrogen (commercial product, manure or compost) can enhance the crop's tolerance to an attack. Nitrogen in the soil can also be increased by rotating maize and sorghum with a non-host legume crops e.g. cowpea. This can also prevent pest build-up in the field

The Ministry of Agriculture in Zambia, who are partners of the CABi-led programme, Plantwise recommend breaking the stems by ploughing or harrowing after harvest to expose caterpillars to natural enemies and extreme weather which can limit the pest the following season. They also recommend leaving the residues if there are no residues of B. fusca as it improves the soil and prevents water loss. They recommend destroying any alternate hosts e.g. wild sorghum and to not rotate with alternative B. fusca hosts.

==== Prevention with push and pull crops ====
Plantwise and partners from Self Help Africa recommend implementing a 'push-pull' system in which Desmodium, a repellent plant, and Napier grass, a trap crop, are intercropped with maize or sorghum can lure the insect away from the crop.

Stem borer moths do not like the smell of the fodder legume Desmodium. When it is planted between rows of maize, it pushes away the moths. Desmodium is also a good cover crop to reduce soil erosion. It can be ploughed back into the soil to increase soil health. Desmodium can be planted as an intercrop between maize rows.

In contrast, stem borer moths like the napier grass. When it is planted around maize, it serves as a trap crop. The stem borer moths will lay eggs onto Napier grass instead of maize. The eggs hatch into caterpillars that will bore into the grass, which produces sticky glue that traps them.

Furthermore, Napier grass produces smells that can attract the stem borer's natural enemies. Napier grass is a feed crop for animals, and its root system helps prevent soil erosion. Napier grass can be planted on the border of the plot where maize is to be grown.

Both Desmodium and Napier grass can be harvested regularly and used as feed for livestock.

=== Control ===
Application of ash or dry soil, by putting one teaspoon of ash or soil into the leaf-funnel of young plants before any symptoms appear is one method that can be used to control B. fusca.

Biological control methods have been used to control B. fusca infestation on sorghum. This includes the release of parasitic wasps including Cotesia flavipes or Xanthopimpla stemmator.

Chemical control methods can also be used to control B. fusca.

Due to variable regulations around (de-)registration of pesticides, specific chemical control methods may differ between countries.

== Sources ==
This article incorporates text from a free content work. Licensed under CC-BY-SA (license statement/permission). Text taken from Plantwise Factsheets for Farmers: Tephrosia spray against maize stalk borer, Dennis Mooya, CABI.

This article incorporates text from a free content work. Licensed under CC-BY-SA (license statement/permission). Text taken from Plantwise Factsheets for Farmers: Neem sprays against African stalk borer in Maize, Brian Chisunka, CABI.

This article incorporates text from a free content work. Licensed under CC-BY-SA (license statement/permission). Text taken from PMDG: Stalk borer in maize and Sorghum - Zambia, Demian Mabote Ndalamei, CABI.

This article incorporates text from a free content work. Licensed under CC-BY-SA (license statement/permission). Text taken from PMDG: Stem borers on sorghum, Plantwise, CABI.

This article incorporates text from a free content work. Licensed under CC-BY-SA (license statement/permission). Text taken from Plantwise Factsheets for Farmers: Intercrop maize with cowpea against stalk borer, Liberatus W. Msasa, Happiness C. Lopa & Jubilant Mwangi, CABI.

This article incorporates text from a free content work. Licensed under CC-BY-SA (license statement/permission). Text taken from PMDG: African maize stalk borer - Tanzania, Jeremiah Sembosi, Joyce Bakengi & Jubilant Mwangi, CABI.

This article incorporates text from a free content work. Licensed under CC-BY-SA (license statement/permission). Text taken from Plantwise Factsheets for Farmers: Pull and push crops against borers in maize, Albert Mate, CABI.
