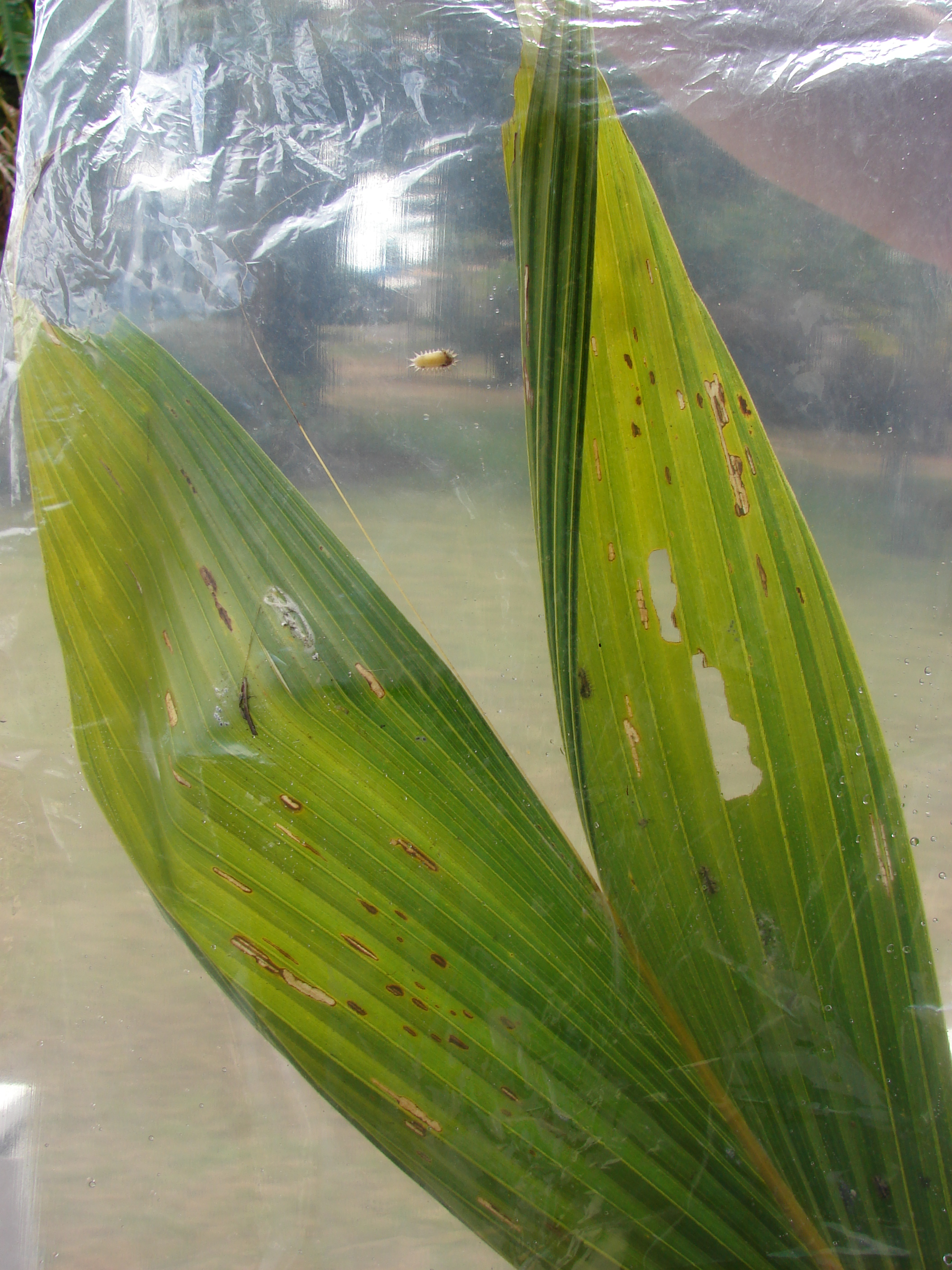
- Darna pallivitta and damage to Cocos nucifera

Scientific classification
- Kingdom: Animalia
- Phylum: Arthropoda
- Class: Insecta
- Order: Lepidoptera
- Family: Limacodidae
- Genus: Darna; Walker, 1862

Type species
- Darna plana Walker, 1862

Species
- D. metaleuca D. nararia D. pallivitta D. plana D. sybilla

= Darna (moth) =

Genus of moths

Darna is a moth genus of the family Limacodidae. The species D. pallivitta is commonly known as the stinging nettle caterpillar and is established in Southeast Asia. It was introduced to Hawaii in 2001.
