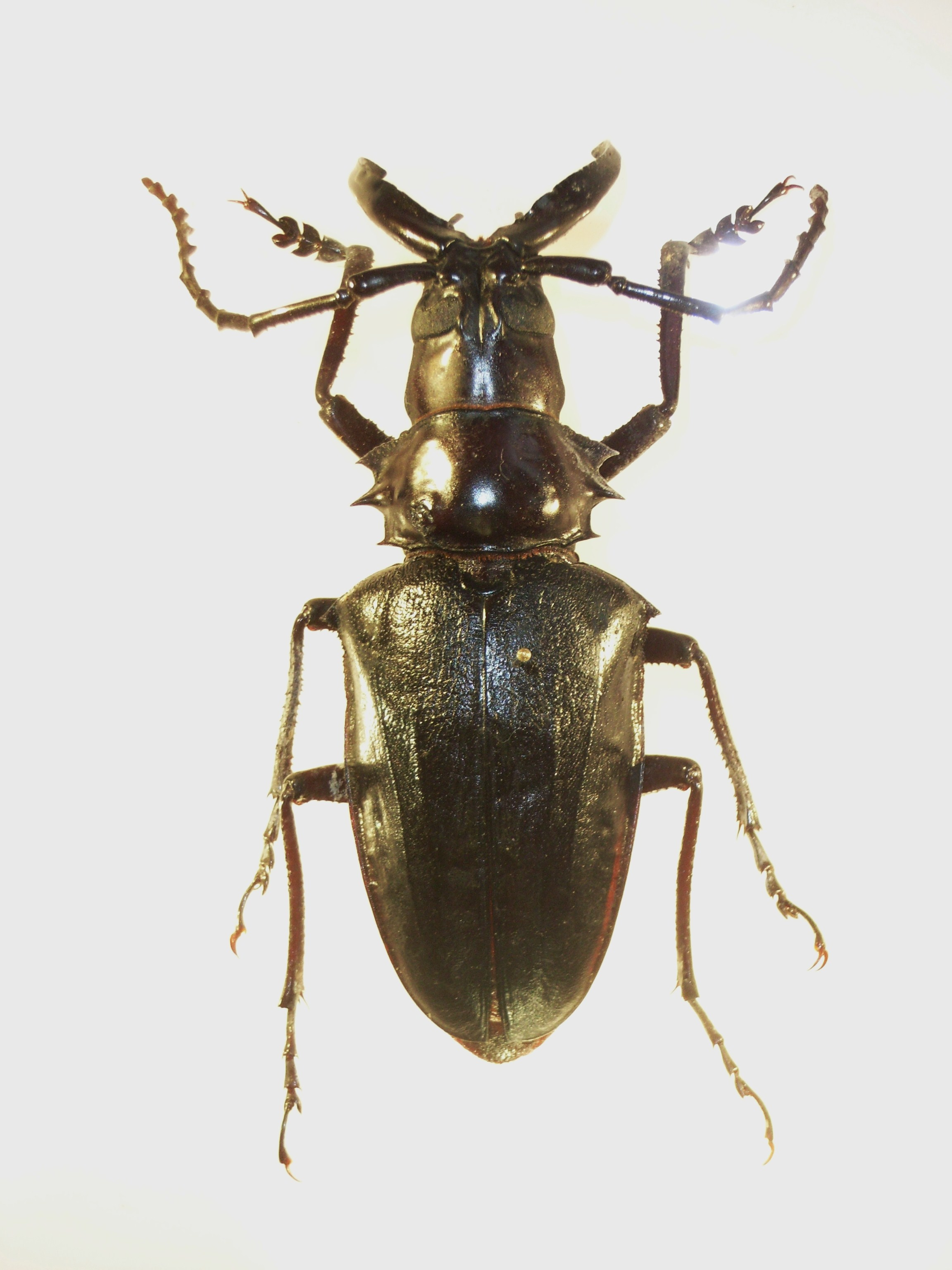

Scientific classification
- Kingdom: Animalia
- Phylum: Arthropoda
- Class: Insecta
- Order: Coleoptera
- Suborder: Polyphaga
- Infraorder: Cucujiformia
- Family: Cerambycidae
- Genus: Dorysthenes
- Species: D. walkeri

Binomial name
- Dorysthenes walkeri Waterhouse, 1840

Synonyms
- Dorysthenes (Baladeva) walkeri Özdikmen, Ghahari & Turgut, 2009; Dorysthenes (Baladeva) walkeri Gressitt, 1951; Baladeva walkeri Gahan, 1906; Cyrtognathus siamensis Nonfried, 1892; Baladeva walkeri White, 1853

= Dorysthenes walkeri =

Species of beetle

Dorysthenes walkeri is a species of longhorn beetles in the subfamily Prioninae and the restored subgenus Baladeva G. Waterhouse, 1840.

Records of occurrence are from Indochina and Hainan island.
