= Busseola =

Scientific classification
- Kingdom: Animalia
- Phylum: Arthropoda
- Class: Insecta
- Order: Lepidoptera
- Superfamily: Noctuoidea
- Family: Noctuidae
- Genus: Busseola; Thurau, 1904

Genus of moths

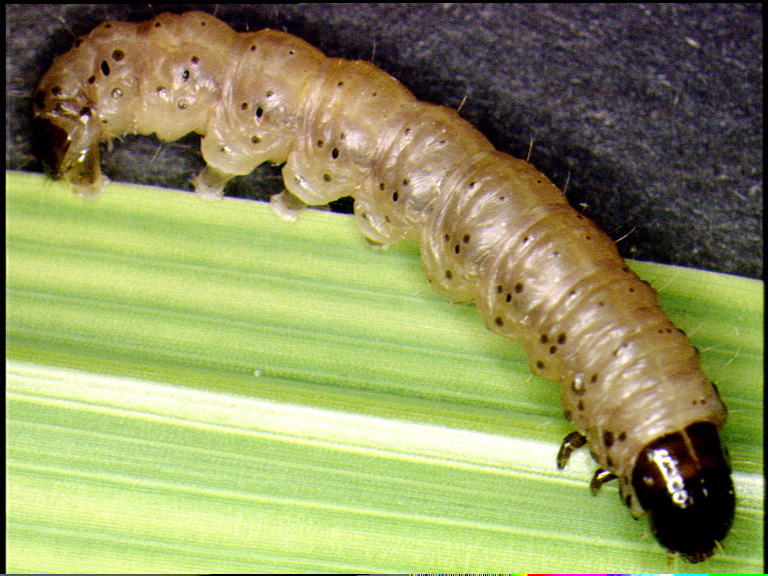
5th instar larva of B. fusca

Busseola is a genus of moths of the family Noctuidae described by Friedrich Thurau in 1904.

== Species ==
- Busseola convexilimba Strand, 1912
- Busseola fusca (Fuller, 1901)
- Busseola fuscantis Hampson, 1918
- Busseola hirsuta Boursin, 1954
- Busseola longistriga (Draudt, 1950)
- Busseola mesophaea Hampson, 1914
- Busseola obliquifascia (Hampson, 1909)
- Busseola pallidicosta (Hampson, 1902)
- Busseola phaia Bowden, 1956
- Busseola praepallens (Hampson, 1910)
- Busseola quadrata Bowden, 1956
- Busseola rufidorsata Hampson, 1914
- Busseola sacchariphaga T. B. Fletcher, 1928
- Busseola segeta Bowden, 1956
- Busseola submarginalis (Hampson, 1891)
