= Dorysthenes zivetta =

Scientific classification
- Kingdom: Animalia
- Phylum: Arthropoda
- Class: Insecta
- Order: Coleoptera
- Suborder: Polyphaga
- Infraorder: Cucujiformia
- Family: Cerambycidae
- Genus: Dorysthenes
- Species: D. zivetta

Binomial name
- Dorysthenes zivetta (Thomson, 1877)

Synonyms
- Cyrthognathus zivetta Thomson, 1877; Dorysthenes zivetta Hua, 2002; Dorysthenes zivetta Weigel, 2006

Species of beetle

Dorysthenes zivetta is a species of longhorn beetles in the subfamily Prioninae.

Records of occurrence are from India, Nepal and China; the subspecies Dorysthenes zivetta laosensis Gressitt & Rondon, 1970 occurs in Indo-China.
