= Cultural methods =

Agricultural pest control strategy

Cultural methods are agriculture practices used to enhance crop and livestock health and prevent weed, pest or disease problems without the use of chemical substances. Examples include the selection of appropriate varieties and planting sites; selection of appropriate breeds of livestock; providing livestock facilities designed to meet requirements of species or type of livestock; proper timing and density of plantings; irrigation; and extending a growing season by manipulating the microclimate with green houses, cold frames, or wind breaks. Helps in proper farming methods

== History ==
1. In the period preceding chemical fertilizer and pesticide use, agriculture played an important part in society. Agricultural output represented the strength of a country, considered directly proportional to its military power and the produce available to support the army in sustained operation. Critical to resources, soil fertility is critical to a successful agricultural economy.
  1. Cultural methods were divided into active composting, fertilizing, and slash and burn farming. Farmers practiced letting their land rest and allowing the wild vegetation to restore the soil.
    In densely populated areas, fields are fertilized with green manure, organic waste from different sources, kitchen waste and ashes. In sparsely populated areas, a slash and burn strategy created greater labor demands.
    One extension of active composting is the addition of charcoal and terra cotta bits; see Terra preta.
2. Chemical fertilizer and pesticides: Chemical fertilizer and pesticides became available and the practice of improper tillage ushered in a period of lesser quality farming practices.
  1. Industrial Agri-business/Enterprise: With the success of the introduction of chemicals and mechanized farm operations, farms became larger and farmers equated chemicals and machines as a substitute for labor input. Farms worker numbers decreased dramatically. (e.g. from 48% of the population to about 2% in the 20th century.) The soil was depleted by imbalanced fertilizing and productivity was reduced further by improper tillage. Weeds are not permitted to grow, therefore inhibiting the buffer available in the subsoil.
3. Organic movement: A movement towards organic farming that sees chemically based production as adverse towards soil health.

== See also ==
- History of agriculture
- Push–pull technology
