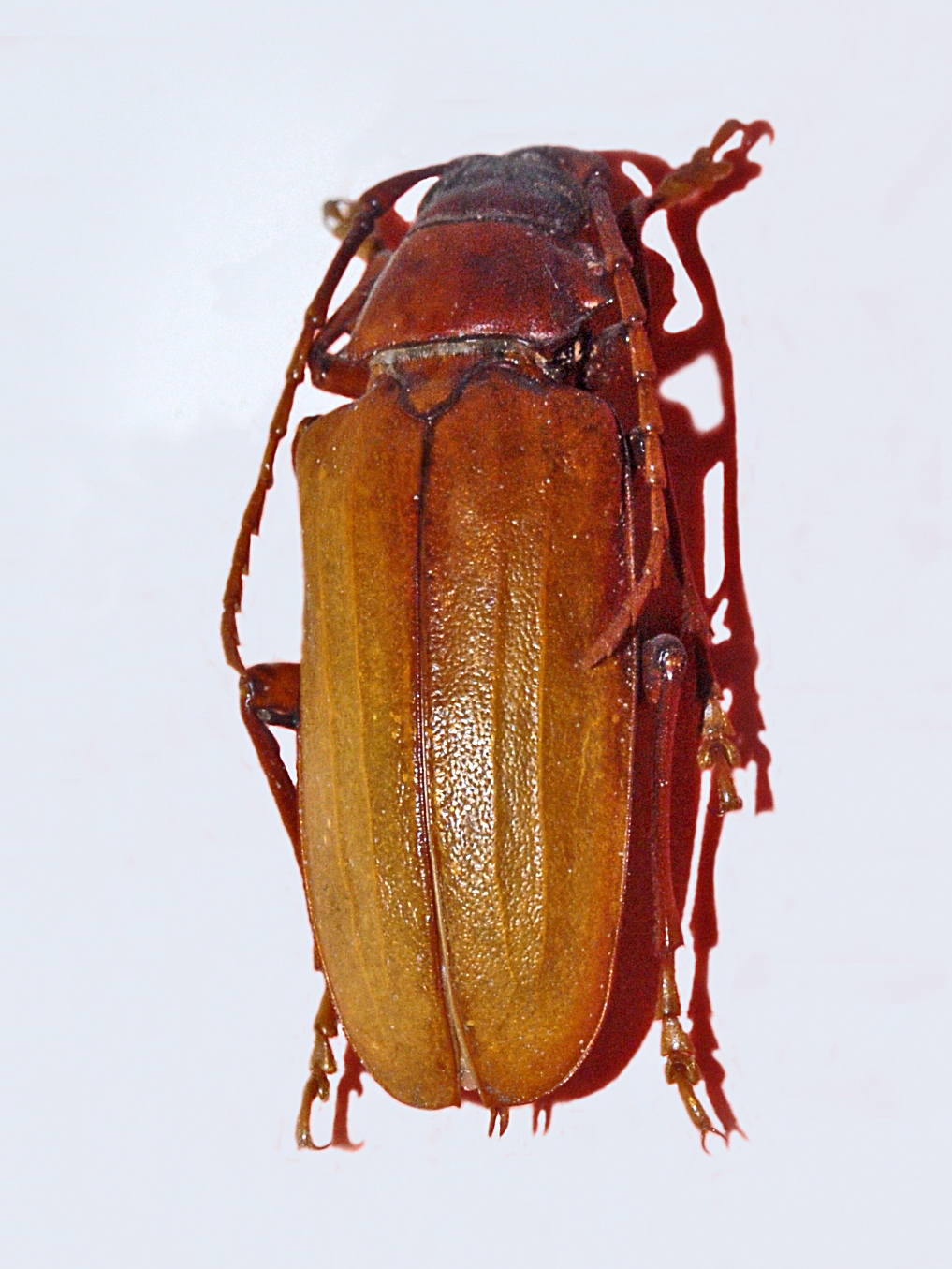
- Museum specimen of Dorysthenes buqueti

Scientific classification
- Kingdom: Animalia
- Phylum: Arthropoda
- Class: Insecta
- Order: Coleoptera
- Suborder: Polyphaga
- Infraorder: Cucujiformia
- Family: Cerambycidae
- Subfamily: Prioninae
- Tribe: Prionini
- Genus: Dorysthenes; Vigors, 1826

= Dorysthenes =

Genus of beetles

Dorysthenes is a genus of Asian longhorn beetles of the subfamily Prioninae.

== Subgenera and species ==
BioLib includes the following subgenera:

1. Baladeva G. Waterhouse, 1840
  1. Dorysthenes sternalis (Fairmaire, 1902)
  2. Dorysthenes walkeri (Waterhouse, 1840)
2. Cyrtognathus Dejean, 1835
  1. Dorysthenes paradoxus (Faldermann, 1833)
3. Dorysthenes Vigors, 1826
  1. Dorysthenes davidis Fairmaire, 1886
  2. Dorysthenes montanus (Guérin-Méneville, 1840)
  3. Dorysthenes rostratus (Fabricius, 1792)
4. Dissosternus Hope, 1833
  1. Dorysthenes pertii (Hope, 1834)
5. Opisognathus J. Thomson, 1860
  1. Dorysthenes forficatus (Fabricius, 1792)
6. Paraphrus J. Thomson, 1861
  1. Dorysthenes bucseki Hergovits, 2022
  2. Dorysthenes granulosus (Thomson, 1860)
  3. Dorysthenes planicollis (Bates, 1878)
7. Prionomimus Lameere, 1912
  1. Dorysthenes elegans Ohbayashi, 1981
8. Lophosternus Guérin-Méneville, 1844

species recognised in this subgenus (possibly incomplete) include:

- Dorysthenes angulicollis (Fairmaire, 1886)
- Dorysthenes beli Lameere, 1911
- Dorysthenes buqueti (Guérin-Méneville, 1844)
- Dorysthenes dentipes (Fairmaire, 1902)
- Dorysthenes florentinii (Fairmaire, 1895)
- Dorysthenes fossatus (Pascoe, 1857)
- Dorysthenes gracilipes Lameere, 1915
- Dorysthenes huegelii (Redtenbacher, 1848)
- Dorysthenes hydropicus (Pascoe, 1857)
- Dorysthenes igai Matsushita, 1941
- Dorysthenes indicus (Hope, 1831)
- Dorysthenes pici Lameere, 1912
- Dorysthenes zivetta (Thomson, 1877)
