= Push–pull agricultural pest management =

Intercropping strategy for controlling agricultural pests

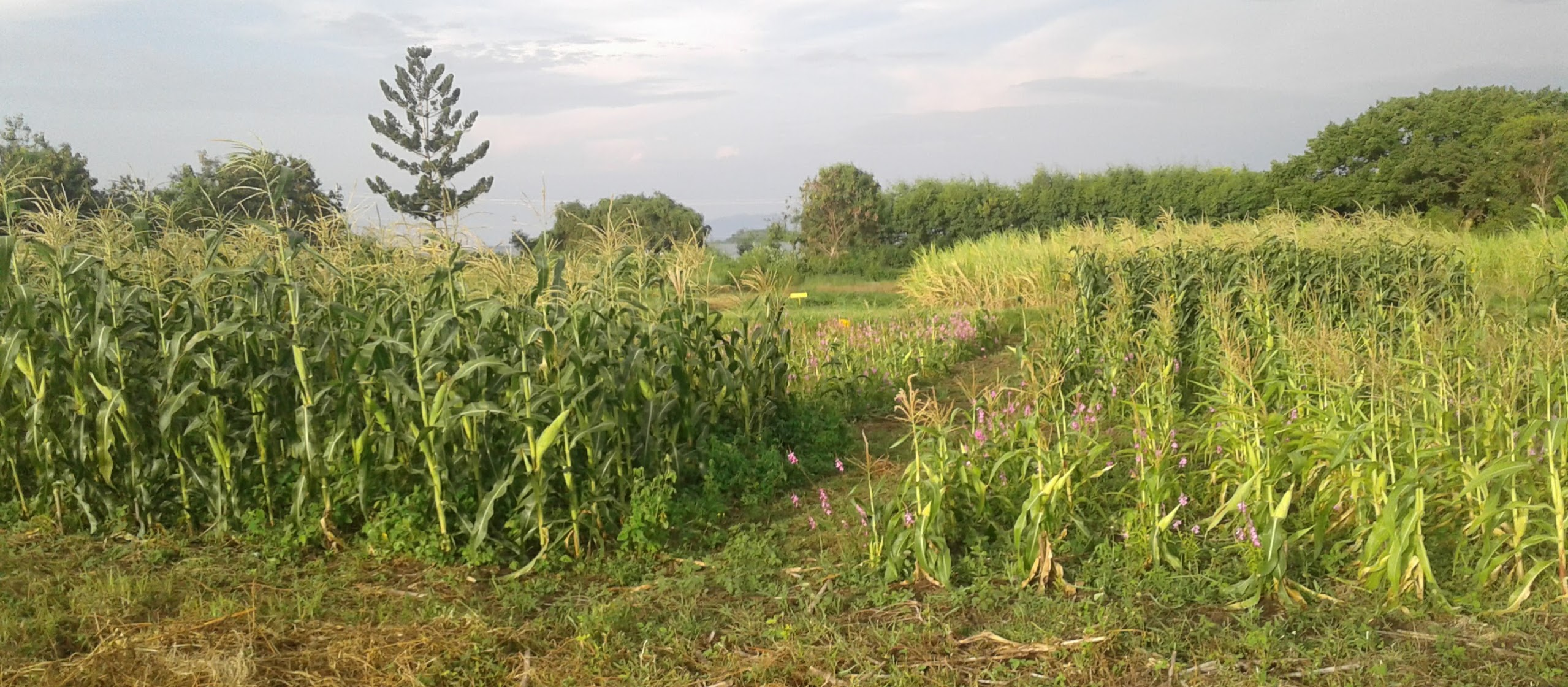
"Push-pull" experimental plots at ICIPE campus in Mbita, Kenya. (Left: Maize with Desmodium spp. intercropping. Right: Maize monoculture with Striga infestation).

Push–pull technology is an intercropping strategy for controlling agricultural pests by using repellent "push" plants and trap "pull" plants. For example, cereal crops like maize or sorghum are often infested by stem borers. Grasses planted around the perimeter of the crop attract and trap the pests, whereas other plants, like Desmodium, planted between the rows of maize, repel the pests and control the parasitic plant Striga. Push–pull technology was developed at the International Centre of Insect Physiology and Ecology (ICIPE) in Kenya in collaboration with Rothamsted Research, UK. and national partners. This technology has been taught to smallholder farmers through collaborations with universities, NGOs and national research organizations.

== How push–pull works ==
Push–pull technology involves use of behaviour-modifying stimuli to manipulate the distribution and abundance of stemborers and beneficial insects for management of stemborer pests. It is based on in-depth understanding of chemical ecology, agrobiodiversity, plant-plant and insect-plant interactions, and involves intercropping a cereal crop with a repellent intercrop such as Desmodium uncinatum (silverleaf) (push), with an attractive trap plant such as Napier grass (pull) planted as a border crop around this intercrop. Gravid stemborer females are repelled from the main crop and are simultaneously attracted to the trap crop.

=== The push ===
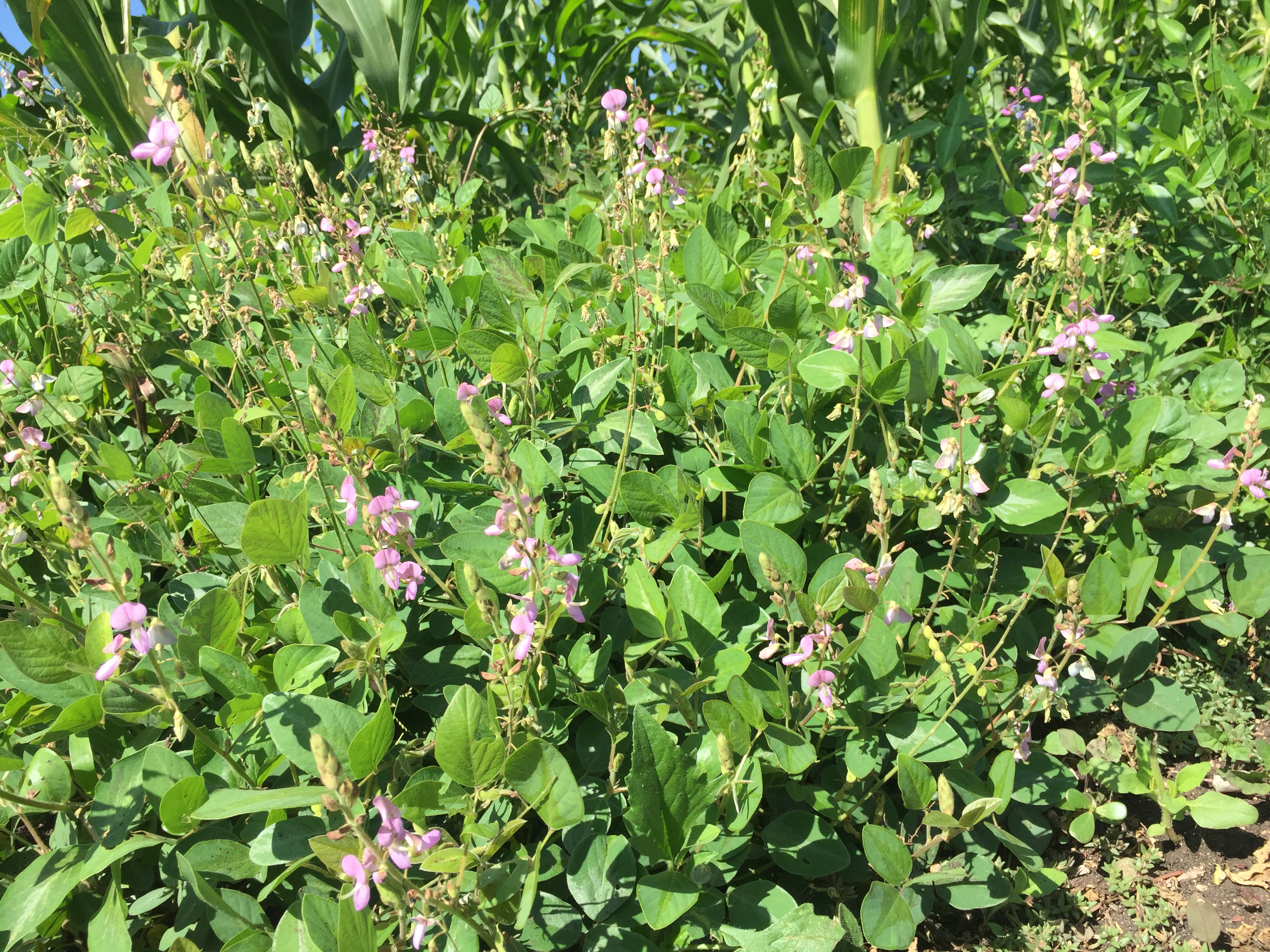
"Push": Silverleaf Desmodium (D. uncinatum) in flower

The "push" in the intercropping scheme is provided by the plants that emit volatile chemicals (kairomones) which repel stemborer moths and drive them away from the main crop (maize or sorghum). The most commonly used species of push plants are legumes of the genus Desmodium (e.g. silverleaf Desmodium, D. uncinatum, and greenleaf Desmodium, D. intortum). The Desmodium is planted in between the rows of maize or sorghum, where they emit volatile chemicals (such as (E)-β-ocimene and (E)-4,8-dimethyl-1,3,7-nonatriene) that repel the stemborer moths. These semiochemicals are also produced in grasses such as maize when they are damaged by insect herbivores, which may explain why they are repellent to stemborers. Being a low-growing plant, Desmodium does not interfere with the growth of crops, but can suppress weeds and help improve soil quality by increasing soil organic matter content, fixing nitrogen, and stabilizing soils from erosion. It also serves as a highly nutritious animal feed and effectively suppresses striga weeds through an allelopathic mechanism. Another plant showing good repellent properties is molasses grass (Melinis minutiflora), a nutritious animal feed with tick-repelling and stemborer larval parasitoid attractive properties.

=== The pull ===
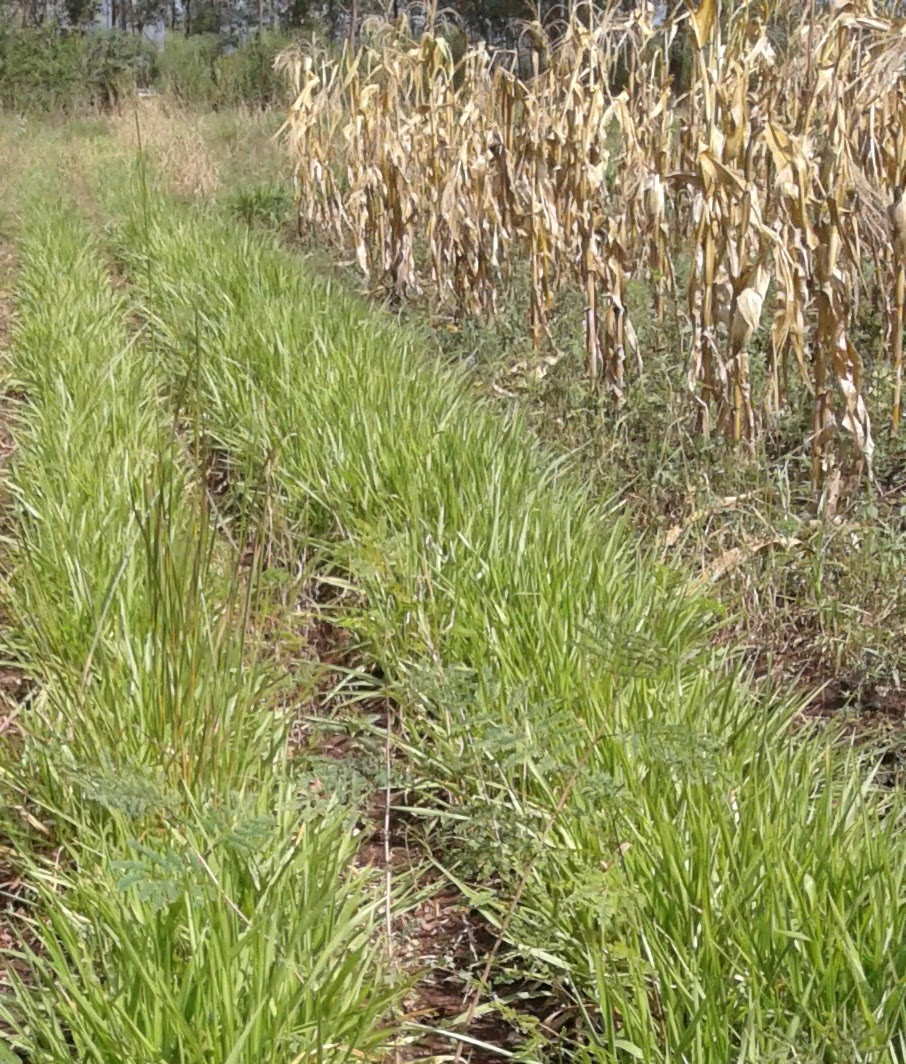
"Pull": Strip of Signal grass (Brachiaria brizantha) planted along the edge of a push-pull field in Kenya

The approach relies on a combination of companion crops to be planted around and among maize or sorghum. Both domestic and wild grasses can help to protect the crops by attracting and trapping the stemborers. The grasses are planted in the border around the maize and sorghum fields where invading adult moths become attracted to chemicals emitted by the grasses themselves. Instead of landing on the maize or sorghum plants, the insects head for what appears to be a tastier meal. These grasses provide the "pull" in the "push–pull" strategy. They also serve as a haven for the borers' natural enemies. Good trap crops include well-known grasses such as Napier grass (Pennisetum purpureum), Signal grass (Brachiaria brizantha), and Sudan grass (Sorghum vulgare sudanense). Napier grass produces significantly higher levels of attractive volatile compounds (green leaf volatiles), cues used by gravid stemborer females to locate host plants, than maize or sorghum. There is also an increase of approximately 100-fold in the total amounts of these compounds produced in the first hour of nightfall by Napier grass (scotophase), the period at which stemborer moths seek host plants for laying eggs, causing the differential oviposition preference. However, many of the stemborer larvae, about 80%, do not survive, as Napier grass tissues produce sticky sap in response to feeding by the larvae, which traps them, causing the death of the larvae.

Recent large-scale field studies in East Africa show that maize grown in push–pull systems has higher levels of two benzoxazinoid glycosides, compounds known for their antiherbivore properties. These glycosides were present in greater abundance in maize leaves from push–pull fields compared to those from conventional fields.

=== Suppression of Striga ===
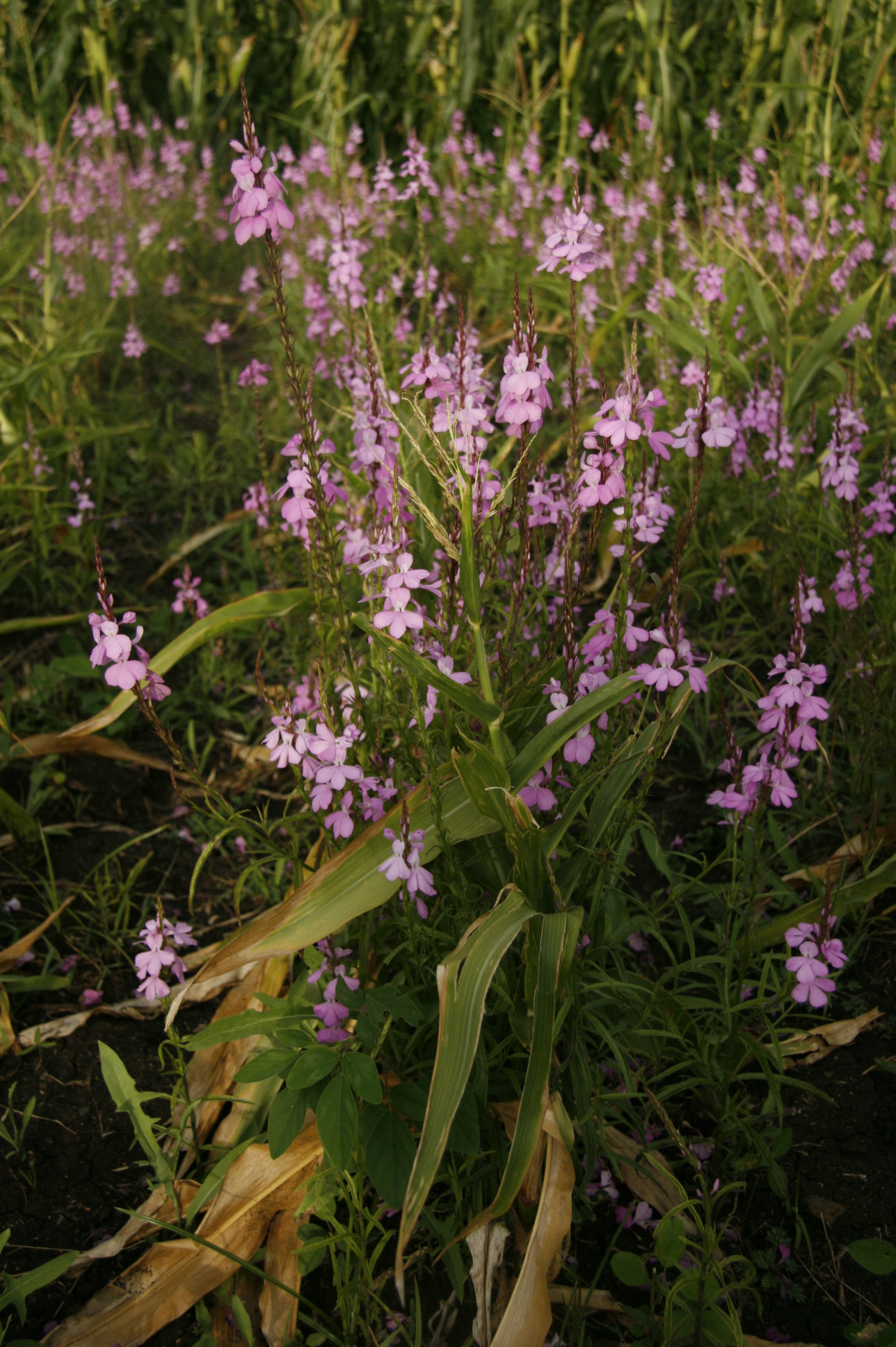
Striga hermonthica growing in maize field in Kenya.

Desmodium also controls the parasitic weed, Striga, resulting in significant yield increases of about 2 tonnes/hectare (0.9 short tons per acre) per cropping season. In addition to benefits derived from increased nitrogen availability and competition for light, it was found that D. uncinatum strongly suppresses striga growth through allelopathy. These effects are thought to be related to isoflavanones produced in Desmodium roots, which can either promote the germination of striga seeds or inhibit seedling growth, depending on their structure. Together, these effects result in the phenomenon known as "suicidal germination", thus reducing the striga seed bank in the soil. Other Desmodium species have also been evaluated and have similar effects on stemborers and striga weed and are currently being used as intercrops in maize, sorghum and millets.

=== Improvement of soil quality ===
Desmodium also enhances soil quality by increasing soil organic matter, nitrogen content, and soil biodiversity, as well as conserving moisture, moderating soil temperature and preventing erosion.

== Economics ==
Push-pull agriculture leads to beneficial economic outcomes on the level of individual smallholder and subsistence farmers through larger income streams coming from the sale of surplus grain, desmodium seeds, fodder, and milk. Economic study has calculated the return on investment of push-pull methods for farmers to be over 2.2 as compared to 1.8 for pesticide use, and .8 for monocrop. Although startup costs of push-pull technology are highly variable due to the requirements of labor to plant desmodium and Napier grass and purchase of these seeds, costs significantly decline in following growing years. Push-pull technology has also been seen to help boost local economies. Because these farmers have more income, they are able to spend money in their local economy which boosts the standards of living and prosperity of the community at large.

The primary economic opponents to such methods are large multinational corporations such as Monsanto and others that produce seasonal inputs such as chemical pesticides, fertilizers and high-yield seeds that require such inputs.

After controlling for extraneous maize yield determinants, it was found that there was a 61.9% maize yield increase with a 15.3% increase in the cost of maize production and a 38.6% increase in the average net income brought in from maize.

In households where push-pull technology has been adopted in Kenya, increased economic earnings have been associated with more years of education, improved access to rural institutions, and attendance to a larger number of field days when compared with households that have not adopted the technology. Additionally, if adoption of the technology continues at the current rate of 14.4%, a reduction of 75,077 people considered poor could be expected in a situation where the local economies remain closed, and 76,504 fewer people could be expected to be considered poor if the economies were open.

== Cultural acceptance ==
Because push-pull technology was developed mainly outside of Sub-saharan Africa—where international agencies today aim to grow its impact the most—a lack of trust was initially faced. This distrust was fueled by local suspicions that external agents had hidden self-interested agendas. In relationships where resources to implement new technologies are also externally provided, farmers often feel that they must simply passively follow the instructions they are given; however, efforts have been made in Ethiopia to encourage farmer engagement with the development of push-pull technology and to thus make the process more collaborative and bridge this gap. Additionally, as mentioned above, push-pull technology is very similar to traditional intercropping methods which has helped it gain community acceptance

Push-pull technology has also been more widely seen as culturally acceptable and congruent because of the way it provides traditional roles for men and women in the agriculture work. Because push-pull technology can fit within existing family frameworks, the practice does not demand an overhaul of existing dynamics. In order to further make the implementation of push-pull technology, farmers played a participatory and influential role in deciding how the technology would be carried out to best suit their needs and align with traditional practices. For example, local farmers preferred to drill the lines in which seeds would be sown using an ox-drawn plough. In general, by promoting the participatory leadership of local farmers, the prospects of sustainability of such projects are anticipated to be strengthened.

== History ==
Push–pull technology was developed at the International Centre of Insect Physiology and Ecology (ICIPE) in Kenya in collaboration with Rothamsted Research, UK. and national partners in the 1990s. Research and development for the push-pull strategy was funded by a number of partners including the Gatsby Charitable Foundation of the UK, the Rockefeller Foundation, the UK's Department for International Development, and the Global Environment Facility of the UNEP, among others.

== Future prospects ==
This strategy is based around the use of locally available plants, not costly industrial inputs, thus making it both more economically feasible and more culturally appropriate as this method is in many ways similar to traditional African practices of intercropping. For this reason, this method is anticipated to be a popular solution to food insecurity in Sub-Saharan Africa. While this strategy is less resource-intensive, it is more knowledge-intensive. For this reason, mass media campaigns have been launched, public meetings held, printed materials disseminated, and farmer-to-farmer and farmer field school programs established in order to overcome knowledge barriers to the implementation of push-pull technology. The most efficient, influential, and cost-effective methods of disseminating information and encouraging farmers to adopt push-pull methods have been identified to be field days (lead to approximately 26.8% increase in adoption), farmer field schools (22.2% chance of swaying farmers' decisions), and farmer teachers (18.1% chance of convincing farmers to adopt the technology). Additionally, it has been found that over 80% of farmers who participate in field days adopt the technology on their land.

Another measure that has been taken to boost adoption rates of push-pull technology is to distribute desmodium seeds and other inputs that are required to begin this practice. Distribution of seeds and other required inputs has been made possible through partnerships with seed companies and local farmer groups. In order to combat the former shortage and high cost of desmodium seeds that were limiting the spread of push-pull technology, intensive seed production initiatives have been launched and farmer groups have been encouraged to propagate the seeds themselves. As a result of these measures, the market for desmodium seeds has been stimulated and the seeds have become more accessible to smallholder farmers looking to implement push-pull methods in their fields.

In Kenya, Tanzania, and Uganda alone, push-pull technology has been adopted by 68,800 smallholder farmers; however, these numbers may be higher in reality because of gaps in reporting. Because these areas in Sub-Saharan Africa often suffer from unreliable crop production as a result of stemborers and striga, soil infertility, and unsustainable supplies of fodder, the push-pull solution to these problems is expected to be adopted by more smallholder farmers in the future at an annual adoption rate of 30% and a potential annual adoption rate of 50% because of intensive education campaigns that have been launched.

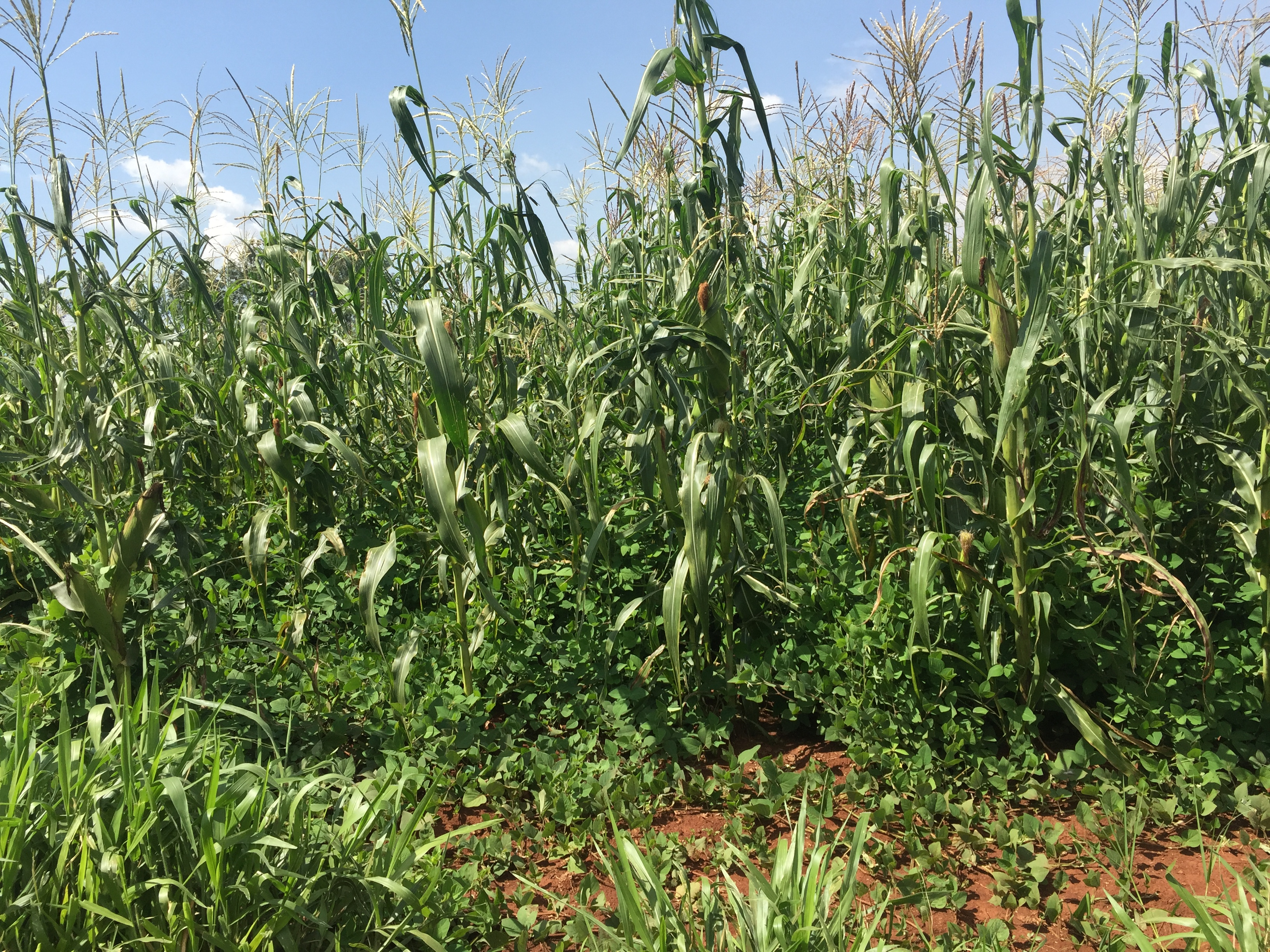
Maize push-pull farm at ICIPE, Mbita Point, Kenya, showing intercrop Desmodium spp.

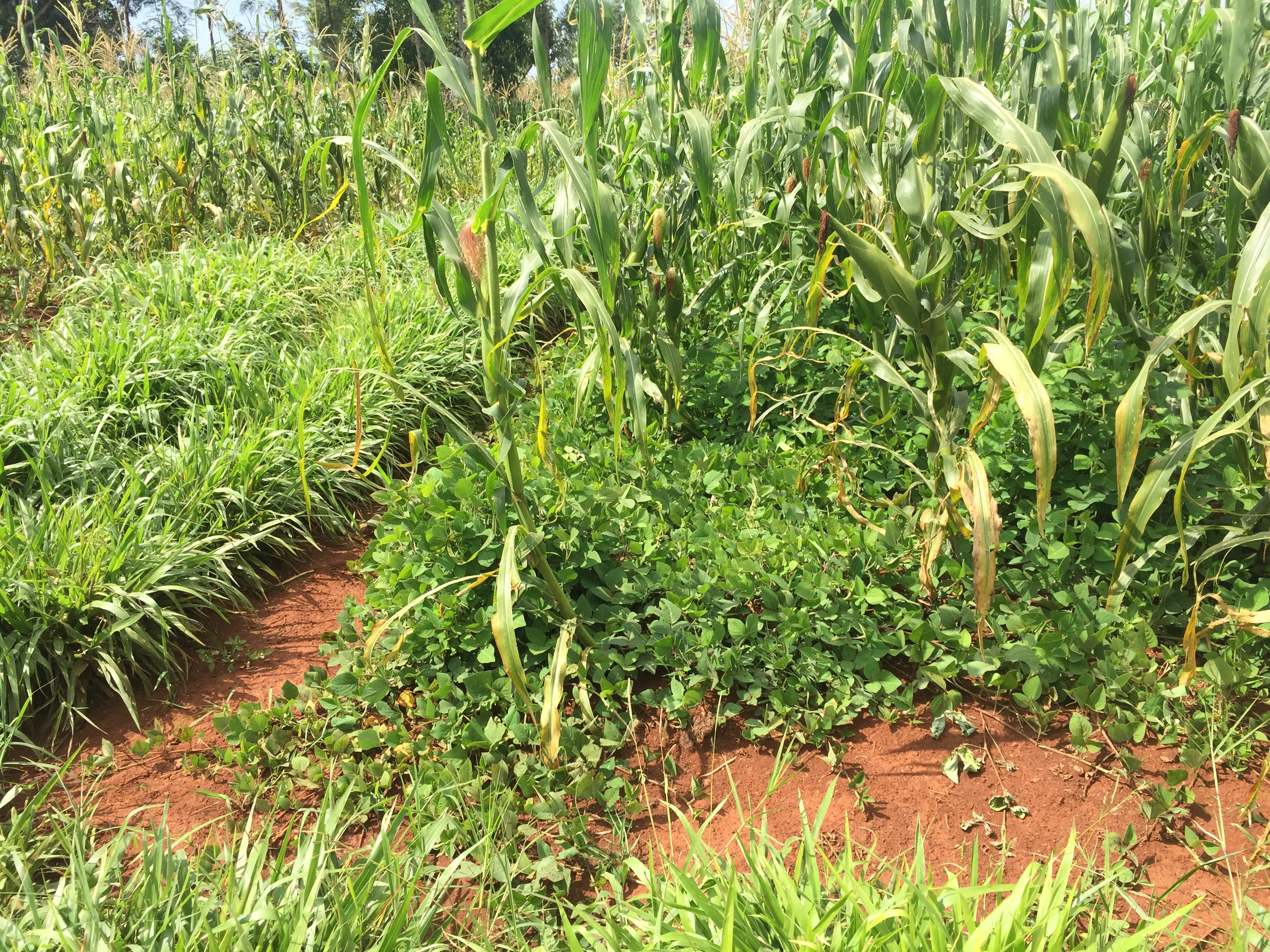
Maize push-pull farm showing intercrop Desmodium and trap crop at ICIPE, Mbita Point, Kenya,

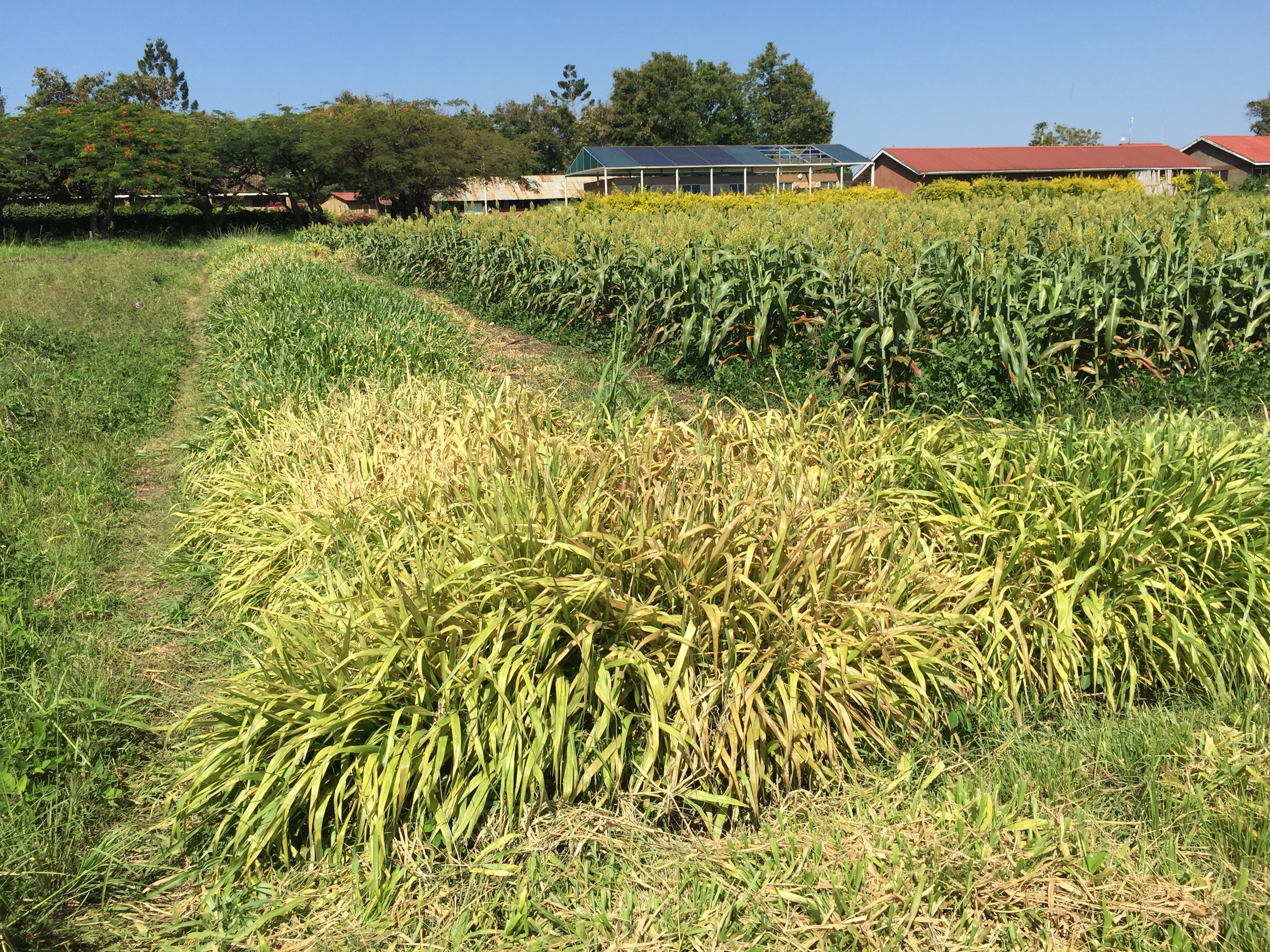
Sorghum push-pull farm showing trap crop Brachiaria (ICIPE, Mbita Point, Kenya)

== See also ==
- Biological pest control
- Cultural methods
- Sustainable agriculture
- List of sustainable agriculture topics
- Ecotechnology
- List of companion plants
- List of beneficial weeds
- List of pest-repelling plants

== Sources ==
Khan, Z.R., Midega, C.A.O., Amudavi, D.M., Hassanali, A., Pickett, J.A. (2008). "On-farm evaluation of the 'push–pull' technology for the control of stemborers and striga weed on maize in western Kenya". Field Crop. Res. (106): 224–233.
