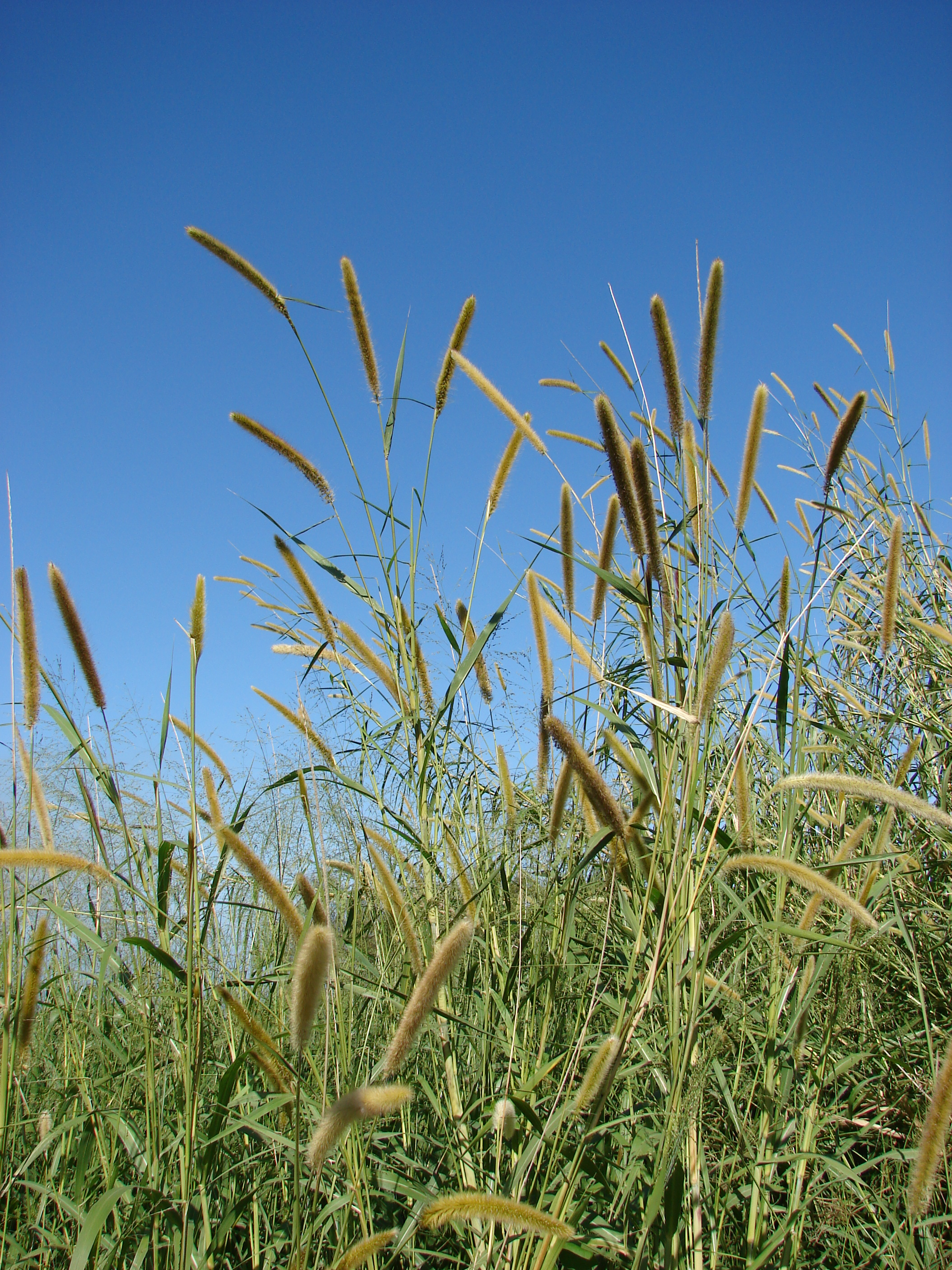

Scientific classification
- Kingdom: Plantae
- Clade: Tracheophytes
- Clade: Angiosperms
- Clade: Monocots
- Clade: Commelinids
- Order: Poales
- Family: Poaceae
- Subfamily: Panicoideae
- Genus: Cenchrus
- Species: C. purpureus

Binomial name
- Cenchrus purpureus (Schumach.) Morrone

= Cenchrus purpureus =

Napier grass

Species of grass

Cenchrus purpureus, synonym Pennisetum purpureum, also known as Napier grass, elephant grass or Uganda grass, is a species of perennial tropical grass native to African grasslands. It has low water and nutrient requirements, and therefore can make use of otherwise uncultivated lands.

Historically, this wild species has been used primarily for grazing, recently, however, it has been used as part of a push–pull agricultural pest management strategy. Napier grasses improve soil fertility, and protect arid land from soil erosion. It is also utilized for firebreaks, windbreaks, in paper pulp production and most recently to produce bio-oil, biogas and charcoal.

== Description ==
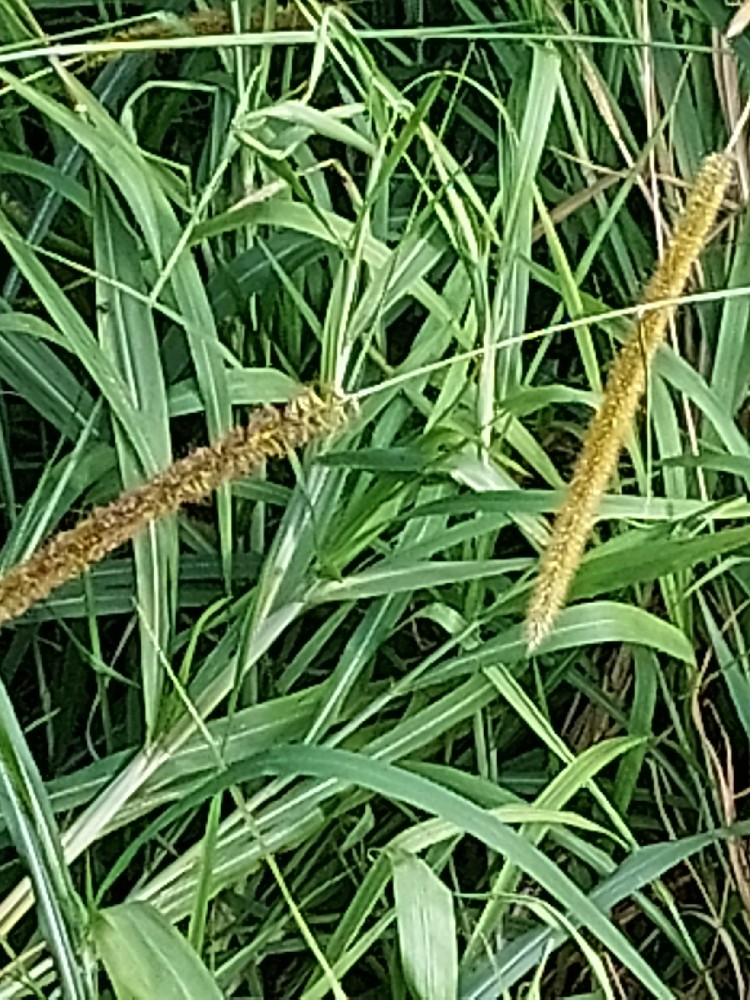
Common Napier (Non-hybrid)

Cenchrus purpureus (or napier grass) is a monocot C4 perennial grass in the family Poaceae. It is tall and forms in robust bamboo-like clumps. It is a heterozygous plant, but seeds rarely fully form; more often it reproduces vegetatively through stolons which are horizontal shoots above the soil that extend from the parent plant to offspring. It requires low water and nutrient inputs. The Elephant grass was crossed with Pearl millet species to form Bajra Nappier. Subsequent work was done to decrease the internode length of Elephant grass. Napier grass plantations produce about 40 tonnes of dry biomass per hectare per year with an average energy content 18 GJ (5 MWh) per tonne, and the grass can be harvested many times per year.

Generally, the grass is harvested in relatively short intervals (every 1 to 3 months) when it is to be used as fodder for animals (its main use), and relatively long intervals (4–12 months) when used for bioenergy. Longer intervals increases the stem/leaf ratio, making the forage harder to chew and digest, but in many cases the annual dry yield increases. The grass can reach a height of 7-8 meters after 4 months of growth. It produces best growth between 25 and 40 °C(77 and 104°F), and little growth below about 15 °C(59°F), with growth ceasing at 10 °C(50°F). Tops are killed by frost, but plants re-grow with the onset of warm, moist conditions. Napier grass grows from sea level to over 2,000 m elevation.

It can be propagated through seeds, however as seed production is inconsistent, collection is difficult. Alternatively, it can be planted through stem cuttings of the stolons. The cuttings can be planted by inserting them along furrows 75 cm apart, both along and between rows.

== Yield ==
Yield depends on management techniques (e.g. fertilizer), soil quality, rain, sunshine and temperature. Recognizing its potential as a bioenergy crop, some yield trials have been carried out around the world. In Malaysia, Halim et al. tested 9 different napier variants and found that regular napier grass yielded the most (65 dry tonnes per hectare per year), with the King Grass variant second (62 tonnes). In Colombia, Cardona et al. estimates a yield range of 40–60 dry tonnes for the napier variant King Grass, under optimal conditions. In drier areas however, yields decline; Gwayumba et al. estimate 15–40 dry tonnes as the general yield range for Kenya.

At the top end of the range, napier grasses have been shown to yield up to 80 dry tonnes per hectare per year, and commercial napier grass developers advertise yields of roughly 100 dry tonnes per hectare per year, provided there is an adequate amount of rain or irrigation available (100 mm per month). These yields are high compared to other types of energy crops. For large-scale plantations with pines, acacias, poplars and willows in temperate regions, Smil estimates yields of 5–15 dry tonnes per hectare per year, and for similarly large plantations, with eucalyptus, acacia, leucaena, pinus and dalbergia in tropical and subtropical regions, his estimate is 20–25 dry tonnes. In Brazil, the average yield for eucalyptus is 21 t/ha, but in Africa, India and Southeast Asia, typical eucalyptus yields are below 10 t/ha.

== Push-pull pest management ==
The push-pull pest management technique involves the desired crop being planted alongside a 'push' plant, which repels pests, in combination with a 'pull' crop around the perimeter of the plot, which draw insects out of the plot. Napier grass has shown potential at attracting stemborer moths (a main cause of yield loss in Africa) away from maize and hence is the "pull" crop. This strategy is much more sustainable, serves more purposes and is more affordable for farmers than insecticide use. Stemborers (Busseola fusca and Chilo partellus) are the cause of 10% of total yield loss in Southern and Eastern Africa and on average 14-15% in sub-Saharan Africa. The larvae cause immense damage to maize and sorghum by burrowing into their stems and eating from within. This not only makes them difficult to detect and remove but also damages the vascular tissue necessary for plant growth.

Insecticide effectiveness is low against stemborers, as larvae are protected by protective cell wall layers around the stem. Insecticides are also expensive for poor farmers and can build chemical resistance by the pests. In addition, chemicals are carried into final food products. Instead of trying to prevent the occurrence of pests, the push-pull strategy (also known as stimuli-deterrent) aims to guide their inevitable biological evolution to prevent damage to valued crops. The method proposes that sorghum or corn be intercropped with Desmodium (the "push" plant), which repels the moths as they look to lay their eggs. Desmodium also provides a ground cover and is nitrogen fixing, which improves soil fertility while decreasing labour involved with weeding. This deterrent is used in combination with Napier grass planted around the perimeter of the plot. A study of Kenyan farmers using the push-pull strategy reported an 89% reduction in Striga (a parasitic weed), an 83% increase in soil fertility, and 52% effectiveness in stemborer control. Considering that striga, stemborers, and low soil fertility together cause yield losses of an estimated 7 billion US dollars or enough to feed 27 million people, the implementation of this technique could significantly reduce food insecurity.

Although promising as a sustainable and affordable option, the success of push-pull pest management highly depends on proper implementation in combination with other good ecological practices. Firstly, not all varieties of Napier grass function as a trap. In a study of eight varieties, only two bana and Ugandan hairless Napier varieties significantly attracted female moths for egg placement over maize. Of these two, only bana significantly decreased survival rates. In a farmer's field, it is recommended that three rows of bana Napier grass be planted as a border crop around the entire field. Potential exists to improve the push-pull strategy through further trials with different intercrops, by manipulating allelochemicals in each intercrop, as well as by investigating insect sensitivity to natural chemicals. Once prominent in a field, it is difficult to rid the area of the stemborer pests as larvae can remain dormant, and therefore push-pull management will not have the intended effect. It is recommended that if an infestation is particularly severe, neither corn, nor sorghum should be planted in the same field the following year but instead rotated with other crops. It is also important to burn infested stalks or, if they have an intended use, to leave them out in the sun for three days. The use of push-pull pest management must be used in combination with good ecological practices to yield the desired results.

Finally, the establishment of a push-pull system requires increased labour in the primary stages and a large enough land plot to allow space for a non-food crop to be planted; these factors often deter its adoption. A program could increase adoption rates through promoting its use in combination with livestock, giving economic value to the planting of Napier grass.

== Other uses ==
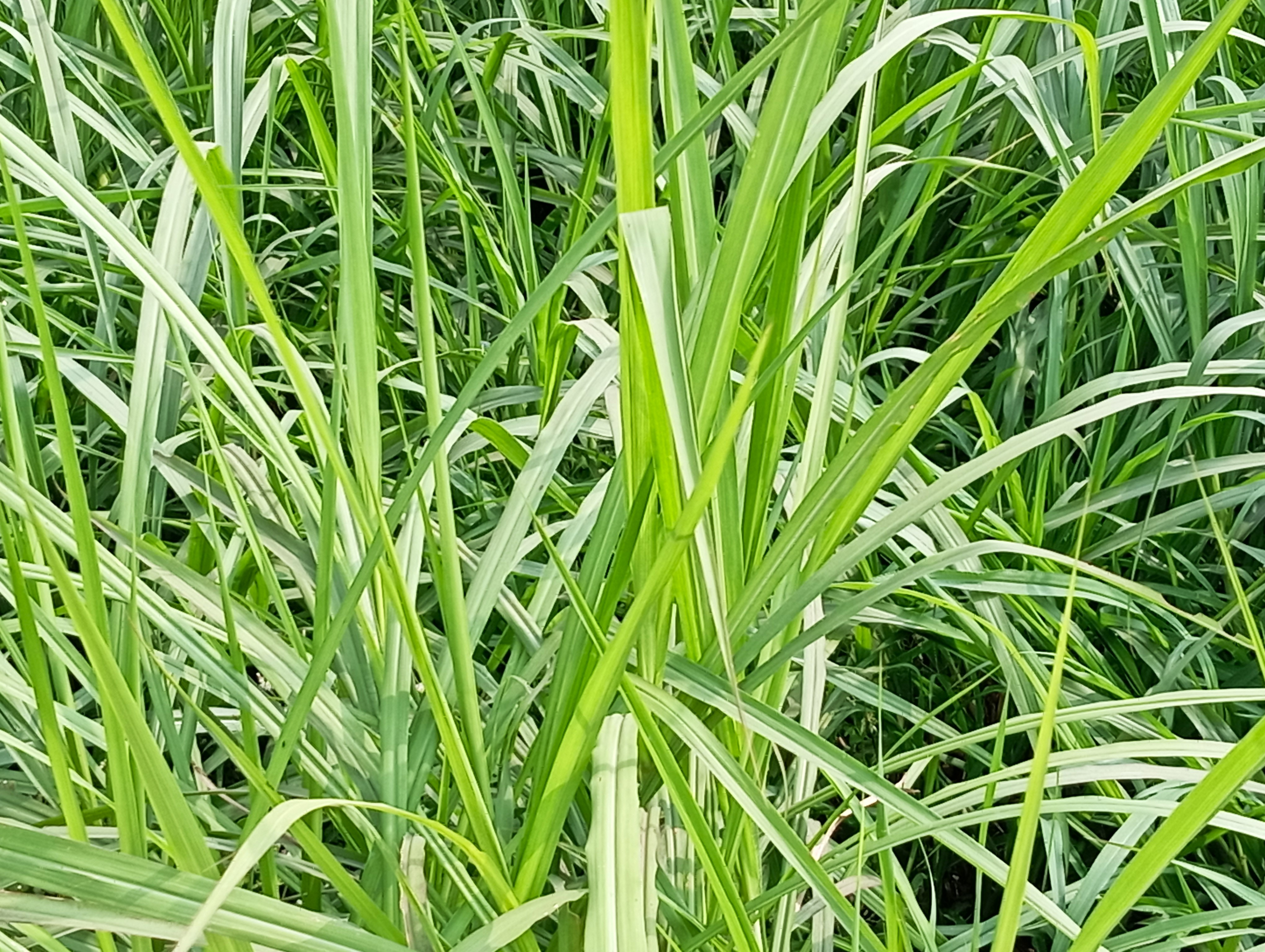
Napier grass (Cenchrus purpureus) as fodder crop, West Bengal, India

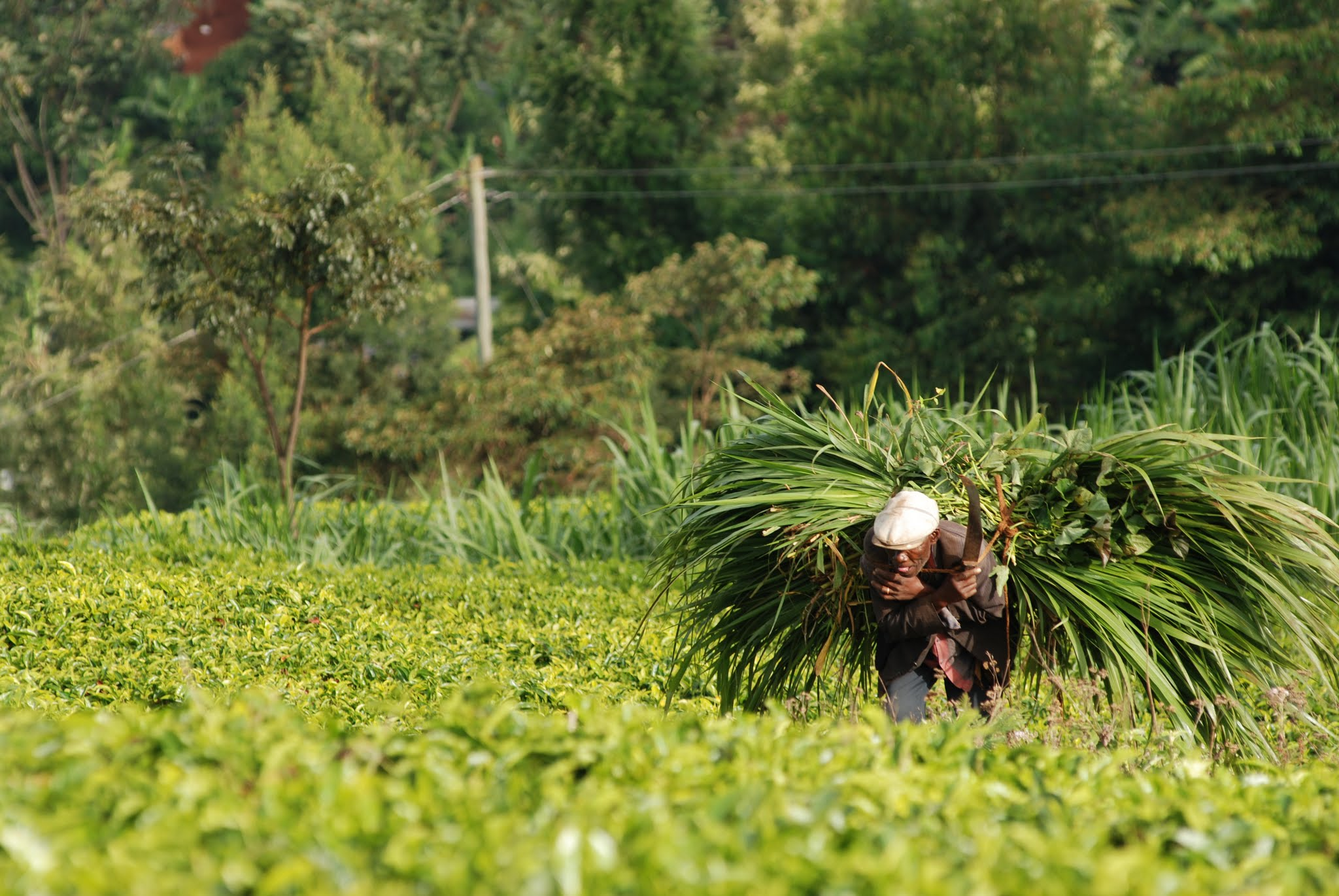
Use as fodder crop in Kenya

Napier grass is the most important fodder crop for the dairy farmers in East Africa. Its high productivity makes it particularly suited to feed cattle and buffaloes. Hairless varieties, such as Ugandan hairless, have much higher value as fodder. As it is able to grow with little water and nutrients, grazing has made productive use of arid lands for food production. Furthermore, livestock can be incorporated into the pull-push management system providing another economically viable purpose for the ‘trap’ plant. Napier grass is valuable to African landscapes as it prevents soil erosion. It can also serve as a fire break, a wind break, and to improve soil fertility.

More recently, Napier has been used to alleviate pressure on food production by bioenergy as there are 2 billion ha of non-arable land suitable for energy crop production. Thermal pyrolytic conversion could be used to produce charcoal, biogas and bio-oil. Although this technology is not currently in use, it could be implemented as a means of providing energy to African communities, while enriching the soils of the local landscape. It is also used as source of fuel. The young leaves and shoots are edible and are cooked to make soups and stews.
