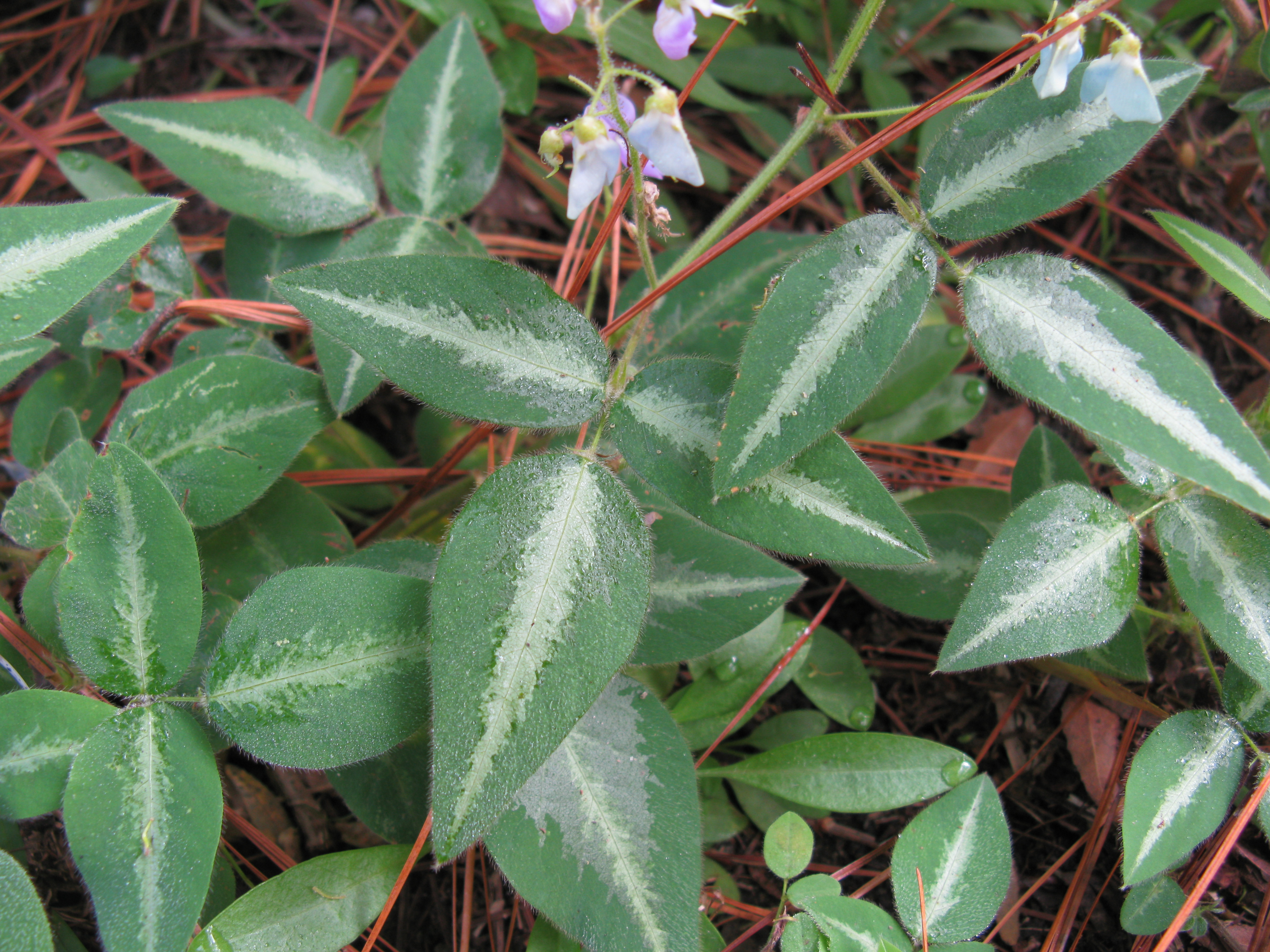
- Foliage
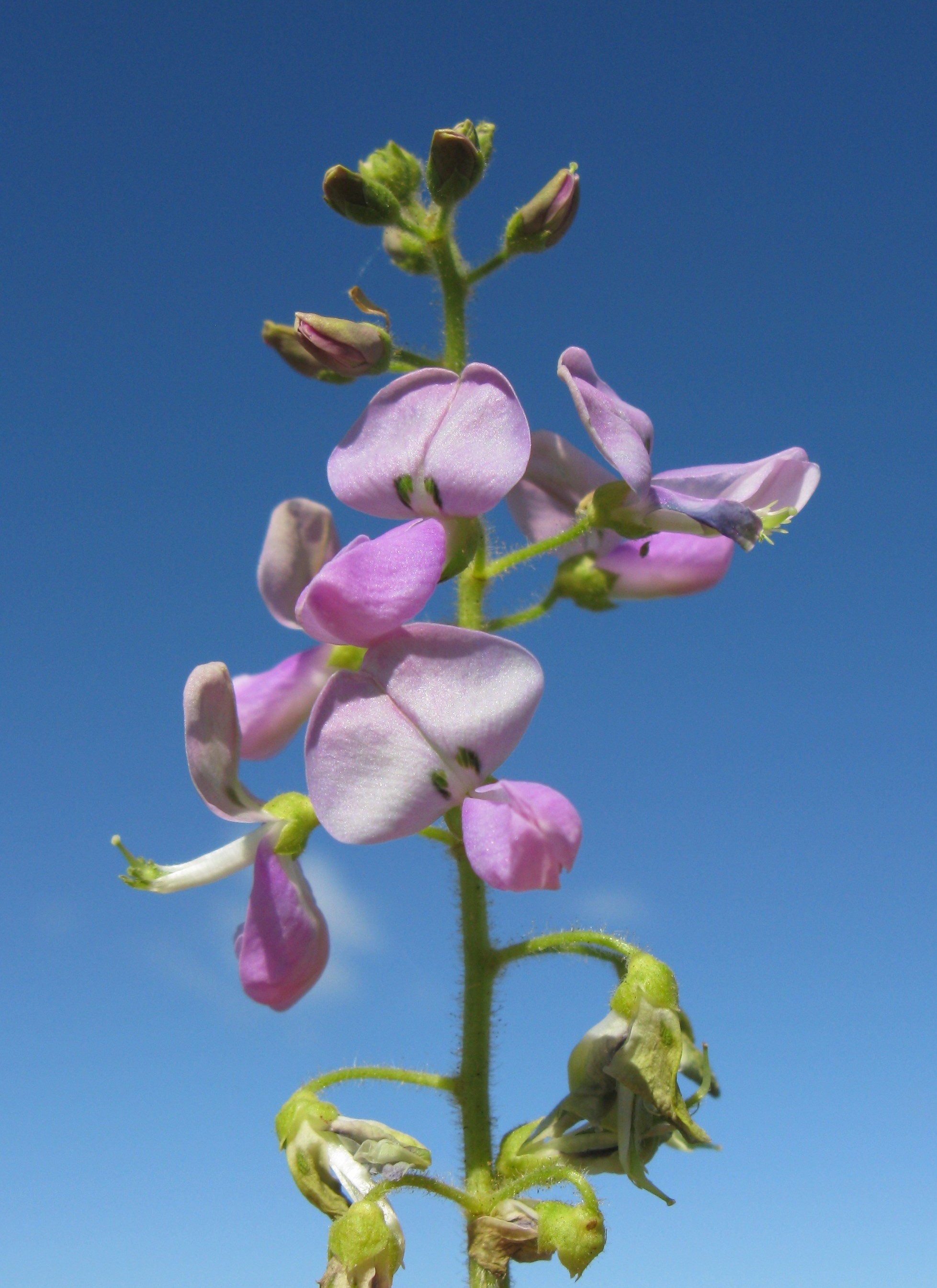
- Close-up of flowers

Scientific classification
- Kingdom: Plantae
- Clade: Tracheophytes
- Clade: Angiosperms
- Clade: Eudicots
- Clade: Rosids
- Order: Fabales
- Family: Fabaceae
- Subfamily: Faboideae
- Genus: Desmodium
- Species: D. uncinatum

Binomial name
- Desmodium uncinatum (Jacq.) DC.

Synonyms
- List: Desmodium hjalmarsonii (Schindl.) Standl.; Desmodium pilosiusculum DC.; Desmodium sandwicense E.Mey.; Desmodium sinclairii Benth.; Desmodium uncinatum var. gracile Burkart; Hedysarum adhaerens Vahl; Hedysarum mexicanum Sweet; Hedysarum uncinatum Jacq.; Hedysarum virgatum Cerv. ex Sweet; Meibomia hjalmarsonii Schindl.; Meibomia limensis var. pilosiuscula (DC.) Schindl.; Meibomia pilosiuscula (DC.) Hochr.; Meibomia sinclairii (Benth.) Schindl.; Meibomia uncinata (Jacq.) Kuntze

= Desmodium uncinatum =

Species of flowering plant

Desmodium uncinatum, the silverleaf desmodium, is a species of flowering plant in the family Fabaceae, native to Latin America, and introduced as a fodder to various locales in Africa, India, New Guinea, Australia and Hawaii. Although chiefly a fodder, it can also be used for pasture, deferred feed, cut-and-carry, hay, ground cover, and mulch. It is considered invasive in Australia and Hawaii.

This species of Desmodium has also found use in the push-pull technology for pest management where it is grown as an intercrop between rows of a cereal crop to control stem-boring insects and fall armyworms. Together with D. intortum (greenleaf desmodium) they are the most common two intercrops of push-pull technology.
