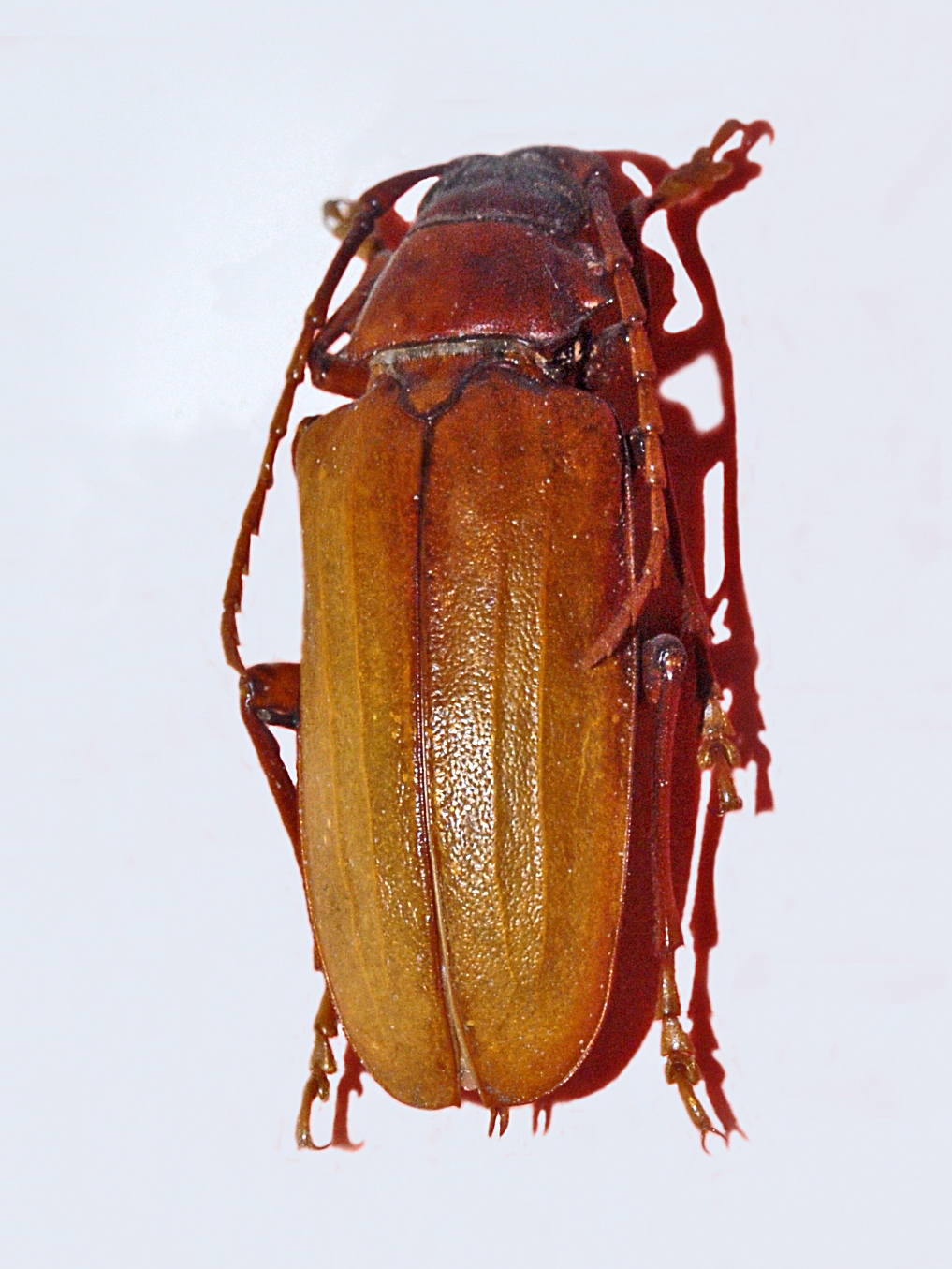
- Museum specimen of Dorysthenes buqueti

Scientific classification
- Kingdom: Animalia
- Phylum: Arthropoda
- Clade: Pancrustacea
- Class: Insecta
- Order: Coleoptera
- Suborder: Polyphaga
- Infraorder: Cucujiformia
- Family: Cerambycidae
- Subfamily: Prioninae
- Tribe: Prionini
- Genus: Dorysthenes
- Species: D. buquetii

Binomial name
- Dorysthenes buquetii (Guérin-Méneville, 1844)

Synonyms
- Lophosternus buquetii Guérin-Méneville, 1844

= Dorysthenes buquetii =

Species of beetle

Dorysthenes buquetii, the sugarcane longhorn stemborer, is a species of longhorn beetles of the subfamily Prioninae.

== Description ==
Dorysthenes buquetii can reach a body length of about 38–41 millimetres (1.5–1.6 in) and a body width of about 14–16 millimetres (0.55–0.63 in). Color may be brownish, reddish brown or shiny brown, with an elongate body and long filiform antennae. Adults are nocturnal. They usually emerge between April–June following rainfall. This species is considered a pest of sugarcane and bamboo. Larvae dig in cane stubble causing severe damage, leading to the death of plants.

== Distribution ==
This species can be found in India, Java, Laos, Malaysia, Thailand and Myanmar.

== Taxonomy ==
The protonym is Lophosternus Buquetii Guérin-Méneville, 1844: 209. Therefore the spelling buquetii (with terminus -ii) reflects the original spelling and there is no justification via prevailing usage etc to prefer later amended spellings such as buqueti.
