= Stemborer =

A stemborer (stem borer) is any insect larva, or arthropod, that bores into plant stems. However the term most frequently refers among the Coleoptera to the larva of certain longhorn beetles such as Dorysthenes buqueti and those of the genus Oberea, and among the Lepidoptera to certain moths of the Crambidae, Castniidae, Gelechiidae, Nolidae, and Pyralidae families.

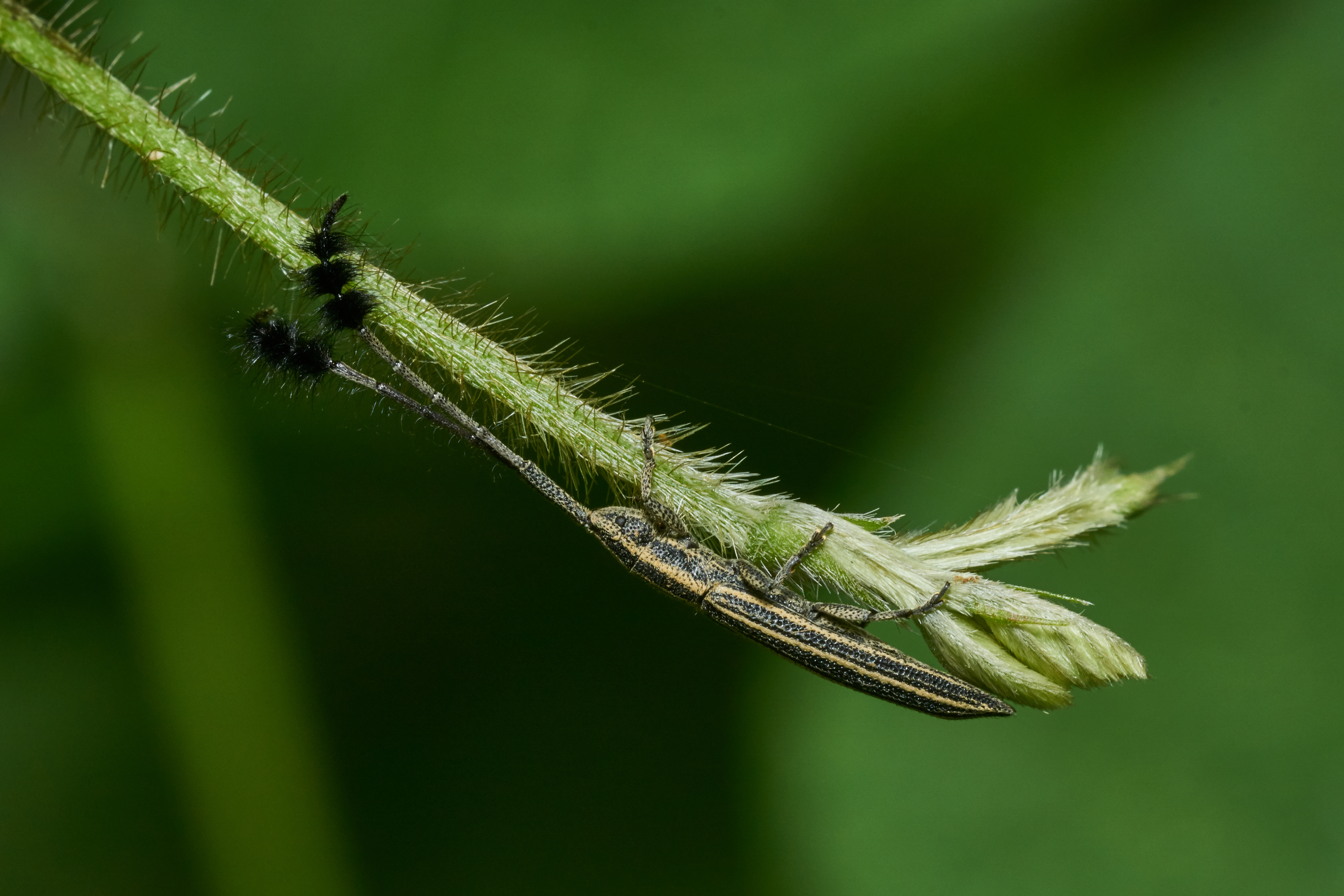
Eucomatocera vittata is a stemborer pest in Pueraria phaseoloides

Stem borers include:

Coleoptera

- Banana stemborer weevil (Cosmopolites sordidus)
- Coffee white stem borer (Xylotrechus quadripes)
- Sugarcane longhorn stemborer (Dorysthenes buqueti)

Lepidoptera

- African pink stemborer (Sesamia calamistis)
- African white stemborer (Maliarpha separatella)
- Asiatic rice stemborer (striped rice stemborer, Chilo suppressalis)
- Banana stem borer (Telchin licus)
- Egyptian stemborer (Earias insulana)
- Gold-fringed rice stemborer (Chilo auricilius)
- Pearl millet stem borer (Coniesta ignefusalis)
- Spotted stem borer (Chilo partellus)
- Tomato stemborer (Symmetrischema tangolias)
- Yellow rice stem borer (Scirpophaga incertulas)
- White rice stemborer (Scirpophaga innotata)
