= Purple witchweed =

Purple witchweed may refer to the following plant species:

- Striga gesnerioides
- Striga hermonthica
