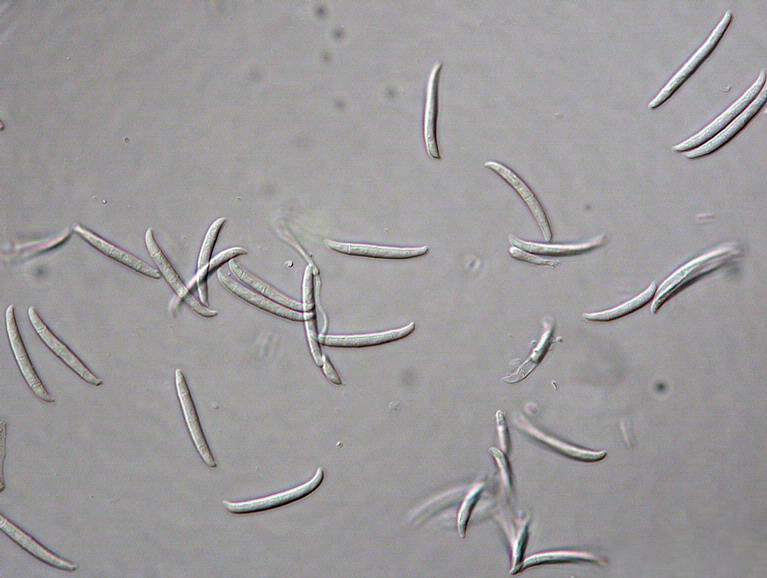

Scientific classification
- Kingdom: Fungi
- Division: Ascomycota
- Class: Sordariomycetes
- Order: Hypocreales
- Family: Nectriaceae
- Genus: Fusarium
- Species complex: Fusarium solani species complex

Synonyms
- Neocosmospora

= Fusarium solani species complex =

Species of fungus

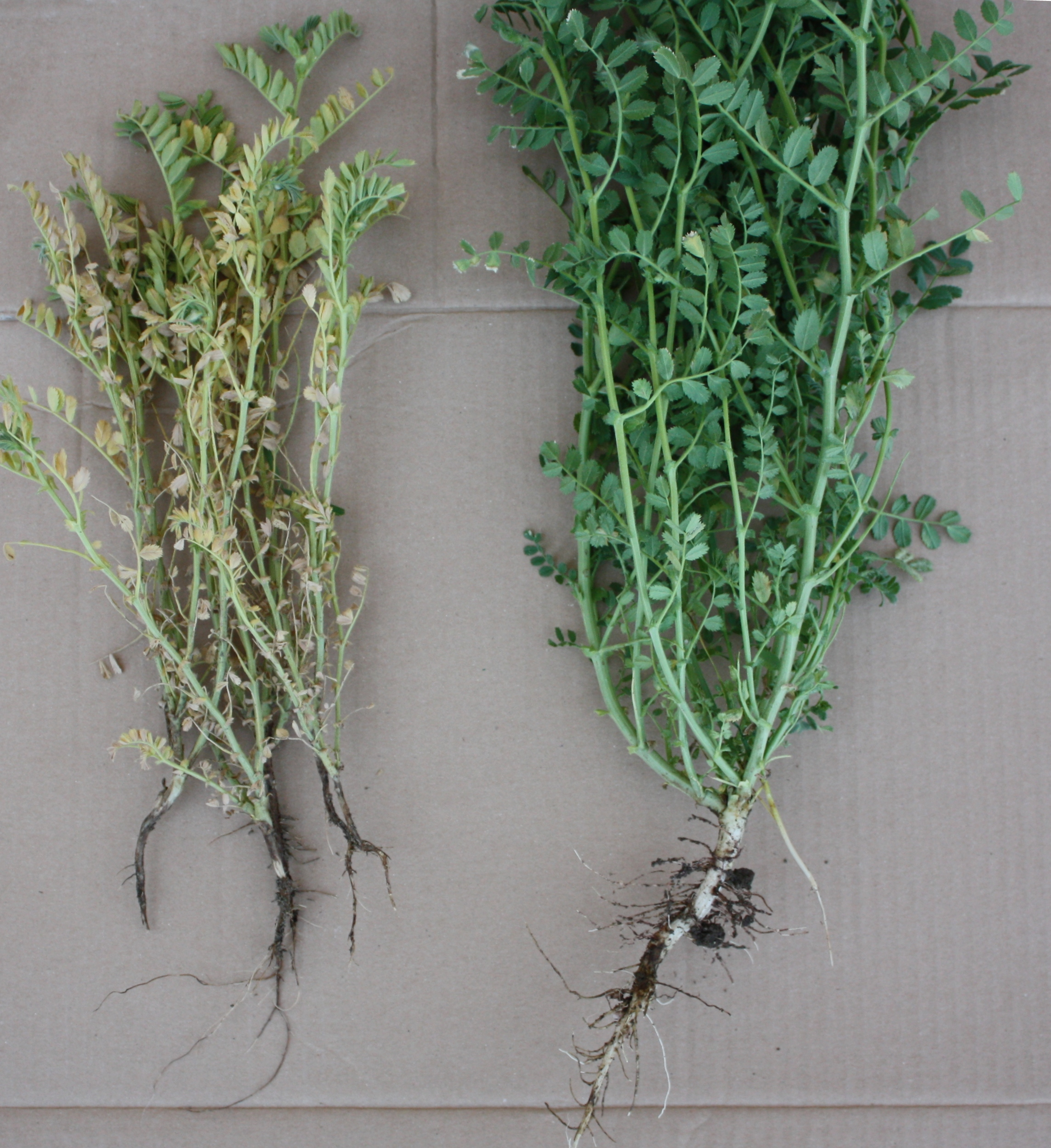
Effects of F. pisi on chickpeas

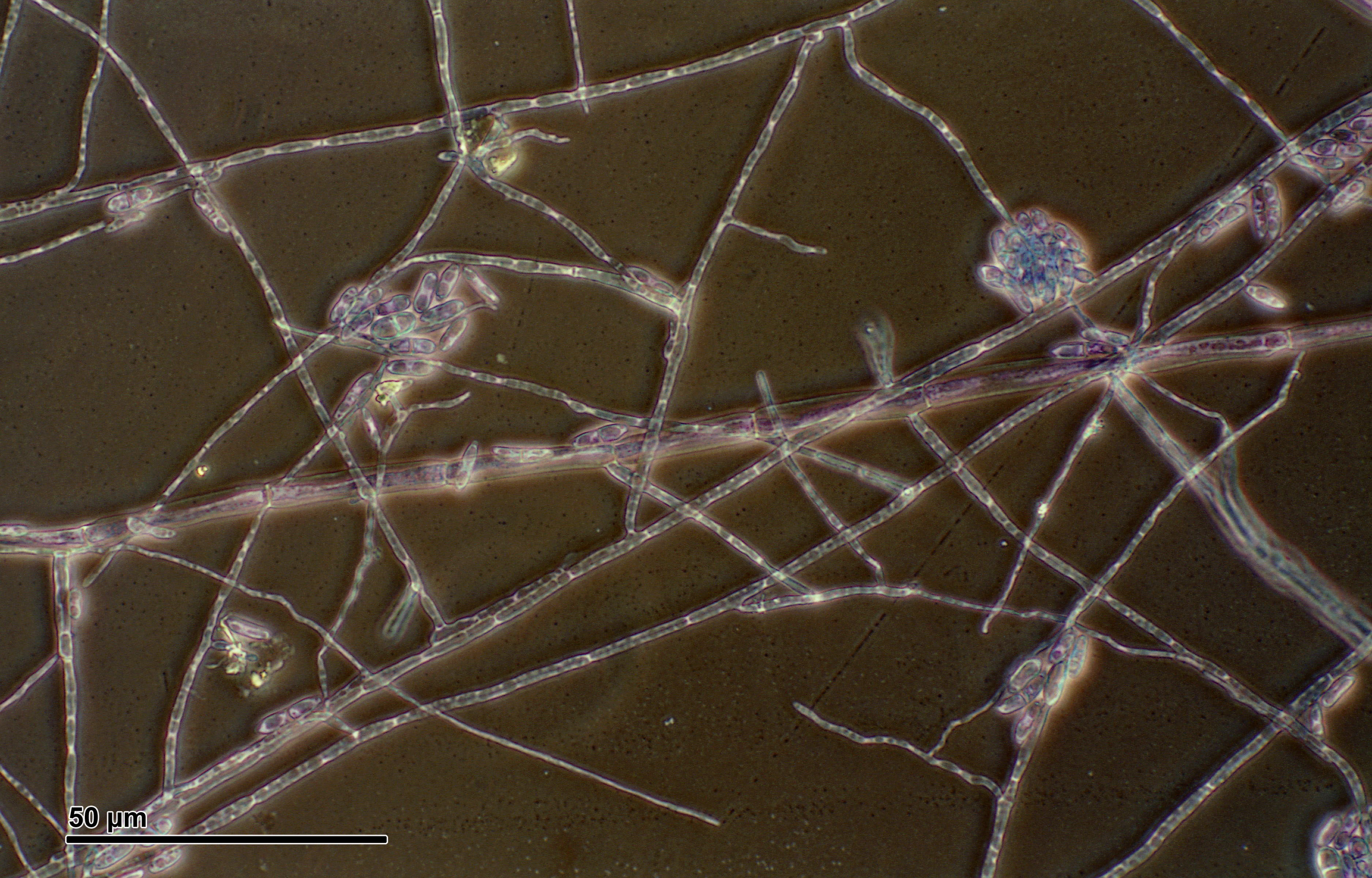
Hyphae of FSSC member

The Fusarium solani species complex (FSSC) is a group of filamentous fungi in the division Ascomycota, family Nectriaceae. Members are common soil-inhabiting molds. Members of this group are implicated in plant diseases as well as in serious human diseases such as fungal keratitis.

This species complex includes at least 50 species. They were originally all considered a singular species Fusarium solani on the basis of morphology, until genetic methods that were able to differentiate between them were developed. Each of them has genetic characteristics that justify their distinction from another, reflecting adaptations to different hosts and habits. For example, the actual Fusarium solani is not associated with bean root rot. Nevertheless, due to the difficulty of distinguishing them without using genetic methods, non-taxonomic sources tend to still call all of them F. solani, sometimes with additional infraspecific designations such as forma and forma specialis.

There exists a "lumper and splitter" problem surrounding the genus and FSSC. Neocosmospora in the modern splitter view of Lombard et al. (2015) is equivalent to the FSSC in scope. Species in the genus are saprobes (processing of decayed (dead or waste) organic matter), endophytes (a fungus that lives within a plant for at least part of its life cycle), and plant and animal pathogens and they are commonly found in soil, plant debris, living plant material, air and water (Sandoval-Denis et al. 2019; Guarnaccia et al. 2021).

== History and taxonomy ==
Fusarium solani

Scientific classification
- Kingdom: Fungi
- Division: Ascomycota
- Class: Sordariomycetes
- Order: Hypocreales
- Family: Nectriaceae
- Genus: Fusarium
- Species: F. solani

Binomial name
- Fusarium solani (Mart.) Sacc. (1881)

Synonyms
- Homotypic: Fusisporium solani Mart. (1842); Fusarium solani (Mart.) Appel & Wollenw. (1910); Neocosmospora solani (Martius) L. Lombard & Crous (2015); Heterotypic, anamorph: Fusarium martii Appel & Wollenw. (1910); Nectria cancri Rutgers (1913); Fusarium striatum Sherb. (1915); Fusarium solani var. minus Wollenw. (1916); Cephalosporium keratoplasticum T. Morik. (1939); Fusarium solani f. keratitis Y.N. Ming & T.F. Yu (1966); Cylindrocarpon vaginae C. Booth, Y.M. Clayton & Usherw. (1985)

The genus Fusarium was described in 1809 by Link. In the 1930s, Wollenweber and Reinking organized the genus Fusarium into sections, including Martiella and Ventricosum, which were collapsed together by Snyder and Hansen in the 1940s to form a single species, Fusarium solani; one of nine Fusarium species they recognized based on morphological features. "F. solani" in this historical, morphological classification actually constitutes a species complex consisting of multiple, closely related and morphologically poorly distinguishable, "cryptic" species with characteristic genetic differences. This species complex includes the sexual species, Nectria haematococca, in the family Nectriaceae (phylum Ascomycota).

There is a "lumper and splitter" problem surrounding the anamorphic genus Fusarium, which affects the taxonomy of the genus. The "lumper" view holds that there should be a large Fusarium that would include all of this complex. It is more similar to the traditional taxonomy used by disease specialists and has more acceptance among them. The "splitter" view holds that the existing finer splits based on teleomorphic morphology (Note: Teleomorphic (sexual) morphology tends to be more divergent than the asexual form, so teleomorphic genera tend to he finer-grained even when only based on morphology.) should be respected and revised. In such a view, genus Neocosmospora should be adjusted to all of the species complex. Both views are based on molecular phylogeny, with the trees largely agreeing with each other; the question is merely where to draw the boundaries on the trees.

As of March 2026:

- MycoBank appears to mostly follow the splitter view, with Neocosmospora species names generally being accepted over the Fusarium names.
- Species Fungorum appears to largely either prefer the Fusarium over the Neocosmospora name or accept both.

=== Phylogeny ===
Internal phylogeny, three loci (tef1, rpb2, and rDNA), maximum likelihood:

- FSSC C. 1
  - F. iludens NRRL 22090 NZ
  - F. plagianthi NRRL 22632 NZ^{IT}
- - FSSC C. 2
    - - F. mahasenii FRC S 1845^{T}
      - - F. kelerajum FRC S 1836^{T}
        - - F. acutisporum NRRL 22574^{T}
          - F. venezuelense NRRL 22395^{T}
    - - F. kurunegalense CBS 119599^{T}
      - - F. nirenbergiae NRRL 22387^{T}
        - - F. cryptoseptatum NRRL 22412^{T}
          - - F. samuelsii CBS 114067^{T}
            - - F. cuneirostrum NRRL 31104
              - - - F. phaseoli NRRL 22276
                  - F. tucumaniae NRRL 31096^{T}
                - - F. crassistipitatum NRRL 31949
                  - - F. azukicola NRRL 54364
                    - - F. virguliforme NRRL 31041
                      - F. brasiliense NRRL 31757
  - FSSC C. 3
    - F. rectiphorus CBS 125727^{T}
    - - F. haematococcum CBS 119600^{ET}
      - - - F. piperis NRRL 22570^{ET}
          - - F. cucurbiticola NRRL 22399^{T} [FSSC 10]
            - - F. protoensiforme NRRL 22178^{T} [FSSC 32]
              - F. riograndense UFMG CM F12570^{T} (M)
        - - - - F. lichenicola NRRL 28030 [FSSC 16] (M)
              - F. ramosum CBS 509.63^{T}
            - - F. neocosmosporiellum NRRL 22166 [FSSC 8] (M)
                = N. vasinfecta
              - - F. ornamentatum NRRL 22438^{T}
                - - F. tenuicristatum NRRL 22155^{T}
                  - F. boninense NRRL 22470^{T}
          - - - F. borneensis NRRL 22579^{ET} [FSSC 30]
              - - F. pseudensiforme NRRL 46517^{T} [FSSC 33] (M)
                - - F. obliquiseptatum AF7 NRRL 62611^{T}
                  - - - F. ambrosium AF1 NRRL 22346^{ET} [FSSC 19]
                      - - F. euwallaceae AF2 NRRL 54722^{T}
                        - F. floridanum AF3 NRRL 62628^{T}
                    - - F. oligoseptatum AF4 NRRL 62579^{T}
                      - - F. tuaranense AF5 NRRL 22231^{T}
                        - F. kuroshium AF12 NRRL 62945
            - - F. stercicola CBS 142481^{T}
              - - - F. crassum CBS 144386^{T} [FSSC 34] (M)
                  - - F. suttonianum NRRL 32858^{T} [FSSC 20] (M)
                    - F. falciforme CBS 475.67^{T} [FSSC 3+4] (M)
                - - - F. tonkinense NRRL 53586^{T} [FSSC 9]
                    - - - F. croci CPC 27186^{T}
                        - F. martii CBS 115659^{ET}
                      - - F. solani-melongenae NRRL 22657 [FSSC 21]
                        - F. noneumartii CBS 115658^{T} [FSSC 42]
                  - - - F. keratoplasticum NRRL 22661^{T} [FSSC 2] (M)
                      - F. solani NRRL 66304^{ET} [FSSC 5] (M)
                    - - - - F. amplum CBS 202.32^{T}
                          - F. breviconum NRRL 22659^{ET}
                        - - F. yamamatoi NRRL 22277^{ET} [FSSC 22]
                          - - F. bataticola NRRL 22427
                            - F. bataticola NRRL 22402^{T} [FSSC 23]
                      - - F. pseudotonkinensis CBS 143038^{T} (M)
                        - - F. paraeumartii NRRL 13997^{T}
                          - - - F. waltergamsii NRRL 32323 7^{T} [FSSC 7] (M)
                              - F. metavorans NRRL 43489 [FSSC 6] (M)
                            - - F. diminutum CBS 144390^{T} [FSSC 39]
                              - - - - F. breve CBS 144387^{T} [FSSC 15] (M)
                                    - F. vanettenii NRRL 45880^{T} [FSSC 11] (M)
                                      = Nectria haematococca mating population MPV
                                  - - F. mori NRRL 22230^{T} [FSSC 17]
                                    - - F. quercinum NRRL 22652^{T} [FSSC 14] (M)
                                      - - F. regulare CBS 190.35
                                        - F. silvicola CBS 123846^{T} [FSSC 13]
                                - - - F. oblongum NRRL 28008^{T} [FSSC 29] (M)
                                    - - F. ngaiotongaense CBS 126407^{T}
                                      - - F. catenatum NRRL 54993^{T} [FSSC 43]
                                        - - - F. cyanescens NRRL 37625^{T} [FSSC 27] (M)
                                            - F. spathulatum NRRL 28541^{T} [FSSC 26] (M)
                                          - - F. macrosporum CBS 142424^{T}
                                            - F. ferrugineum NRRL 32437^{T} [FSSC 28] (M)
                                  - - F. bostrycoides CBS 144.25^{NT} [FSSC 25] (M)
                                    - - F. parceramosum CBS 115695^{T}
                                      - - - F. petroliphilum NRRL 22268 [FSSC 1] (M)
                                          - F. liriodendri NRRL 22389^{T} [FSSC 24]
                                        - - F. pseudoradicicola NRRL 25137^{T} [FSSC 37]
                                          - - F. perseae CPC 26829^{T}
                                            - F. hypothenemi NRRL 52782^{T} [FSSC 38]

Notes and abbreviations:

- "FSSC C." is the FSSC clade numbering
- [FSSC (number)] is a historical numbering used in the early stages of differentiating FSSC species
- (M) indicates medically important species
- Data derived from TreeBase study S27101, tree Tr129542, which does not fully match the paper's Figure 2.

External relations (phylogeny of Netriaceae clade IX), using the "splitter" genus concepts:

- Rectifusarium
- - Bisfusarium
  - - Neocosmospora = FSSC
    - - Albonectria
      - - Fusarium sensu stricto
        - - Geejayessia
          - Cyanonecteria

For more extensive synonymy lists, consult the two rival nomenclature papers.

=== Taxonomy ===
Neocosmospora was established by Smith in 1899. As accepted by Species Fungorum;

- Neocosmospora arxii Udagawa, Y. Horie & P.F. Cannon (1989)
- Neocosmospora boninensis Udagawa, Y. Horie & P.F. Cannon (1989)
- Neocosmospora endophytica Polishook, Bills & Rossman (1992)
- Neocosmospora floridana (T. Aoki, J.A. Sm., Kasson, S. Freeman, Geiser & O'Donnell) L. Lombard & Sand.-Den. (2021)
- Neocosmospora indica Wadhwani (1984)
- Neocosmospora kurunegalensis Samuels, Nalim & Geiser (2011)
- Neocosmospora leucaenae R.H. Perera, Maharachch. & K.D. Hyde (2023)
- Neocosmospora magnoliae R.H. Perera, E.B.G. Jones & K.D. Hyde (2020)
- Neocosmospora obliquiseptata (T. Aoki, Geering, Kasson, S. Freeman, Geiser & O'Donnell) L. Lombard & Sand.-Den. (2021)
- Neocosmospora parva Mahoney (1976)
- Neocosmospora rekana (Lynn & Marinc.) L. Lombard & Sand.-Den. (2021)
- Neocosmospora rubicola L. Lombard & Crous (2015)
- Neocosmospora striata Udagawa & Y. Horie (1975)
- Neocosmospora striatispora R.H. Perera, Maharachch., E.B.G. Jones & K.D. Hyde (2023)
- Neocosmospora thailandica R.H. Perera, E.B.G. Jones & K.D. Hyde (2023)
- Neocosmospora tuaranensis (T. Aoki, Kasson, S. Freeman, Geiser & O'Donnell) L. Lombard & Sand.-Den. (2021)

== Growth and morphology ==
Like other species in its genus, FSSC produces colonies that are white and cottony. However, instead of developing a pink or violet centre like most Fusarium species, FSSC becomes blue-green or bluish brown. On the underside, they may be pale, tea-with-milk-brown, or red-brown. However, some clinical isolates have been blue-green or ink-blue on the underside. FSSC colonies are low-floccose, loose, slimy, and sporadic. When grown on potato dextrose agar (PDA), this fungus grows rapidly, but not as rapidly as Fusarium oxysporum. In PDA, FSSC colonies reach a diameter of 64–70 mm in 7 days.

FSSC has aerial hyphae that give rise to conidiophores laterally. The conidiophores branch into thin, elongated monophialides that produce conidia. Phialides that produce macroconidia are shorter than those that produce microconidia. The macroconidia produced by FSSC are slightly curved, hyaline, and broad, often aggregating in fascicles. Typically the macroconidia of this species have 3 septa but may have as many as 4–5. Microconidia have thickened basal cells and tapered, rounded apical cells. However, some FSSC isolates have pointed, rather than rounded, macroconidia. Microconidia are oval or cylindrical, hyaline, and smooth. Some microconidia may be curved. Microconidia typically lack septa, but occasionally they may have up to two. Fusarium solani also forms chlamydospores most commonly under suboptimal growth conditions. These may be produced in pairs or individually. They are abundant, have rough walls, and are 6-11 μm. FSSC chlamydospores are also brown and round.

== Ecology ==
FSSC is found in soil worldwide. However, a given species within the complex may not be as widespread and may not have the same ecology as others in the complex. In general, as a soil fungus, FSSC is associated with the roots of plants and may be found as deep in the ground as 80 cm. It is frequently isolated in tropic, subtropic, and temperate locations, and less frequently isolated from alpine habitats. The pH of soil does not have a significant effect on FSSC, however, soil fumigation causes an increase in occurrence. FSSC is typically sensitive to soil fungicides. FSSC has been found in ponds, rivers, sewage facilities, and water pipes. It has also been found in larvae and adults of the picnic beetle, is a symbiote of the ambrosia beetle.

== Life cycle ==
FSSC can be found in soils worldwide, where its chlamydospores overwinter on plant tissue/seed or as mycelium in the soil. The pathogen enters hosts through developing roots, where it can infect the host. After infection, F. solani produces asexual macro and microconidia which are dispersed through wind and rain. The pathogen can persist in the soil for a decade, and if left unchecked can cause complete crop loss.

== Physiology and biochemistry ==
FSSC have 5-13 chromosomes, with a genome size of about 40 Mb. The GC-content of its DNA is 50%. Mycelium of FSSC is rich in the amino acid alanine, as well as a range of fatty acids including δ-aminobutyric-, palmitic-, oleic-, and linolenic acids. Fusarium solani requires potassium for growth, and develops a feathery pattern when potassium levels are below 3 mM. In culture the following disaccharides are utilized (from most- to least preferential): mannose, rhamnose and sorbose. This species can decompose cellulose at an optimal pH of 6.5 and temperature of 30 °C. It can also metabolise steroids and lignin, and reduce Fe^{3+} to Fe^{2+}. Fusarium solani produces mycotoxins like Fusaric acid and naphthoquinones. Other toxins have also been isolated from FSSC members, including:

- Fusarubin
- Javanicin
- Marticin
- Isomarticin - causes chlorosis in citrus
- Solaniol
- Neosolaniol
- T-2 toxin
- HT-2 toxin
- Diacetoxyscirpenol

Bioassay-guided fractionation of a fungus Neocosmospora sp. resulted in the isolation of three new resorcylic acid lactones, 'neocosmosin A' (2), 'neocosmosin B' (3) and 'neocosmosin C' (4). As well as three known resorcylic acid lactones, 'monocillin IV' (1), 'monocillin II' (5) and radicicol (6) which were also isolated and identified, where compounds 4–6 show good binding affinity for the human opioid receptors. These findings have important implications for the potential psychoactive effects with this class of compounds.

== Pathology ==
=== Humans ===
FSSC is largely resistant to typical antifungal agents. The most effective antifungals in treating FSSC infections are amphotericin B and natamycin; however, these agents have only modest success in the treatment of serious systemic infection.

As of 2006, there has been increasing evidence that FSSC can act as a causal agent of mycoses in humans. FSSC has been implicated in the following diseases: disseminated disease, osteomyelitis, skin infection, fungemia, and endophthalmitis. Half of human disease involving Fusarium is caused by FSSC and it is involved in most cases of systemic fusariosis and corneal infections. In immunocompromised patients, FSSC is one of the most common agents in disseminated and cutaneous infections.

In the southern USA, fungal keratitis has been most commonly caused by FSSC, as well as F. oxysporum (loosely defined, also a species complex). Cases occur most frequently during harvest season as a result of corneal trauma from dust or plant material. Fungal spores come into contact with the damaged cornea and grow. Without treatment, the hyphae can grow into the cornea and into the anterior chamber of the eye. FSSC is also a major cause of fungal keratitis in HIV positive patients in Africa.

As of 2011, FSSC was implicated in cases of fungal keratitis involving the Bausch and Lomb ReNu contact lens solution. Some members of FSSC can produce a biofilm on soft contact lenses. However, when lenses are cleaned correctly with solution, these biofilms are prevented. Prevention also includes leaving lenses in polyhexanide biguanide solution overnight to inhibit FSSC. Other risk factors of contact lens-related Fusarium keratitis include use of daily-wear lenses beyond the recommended timeline and overnight wear.

An investigation into a meningitis outbreak of 79 cases since October 2022, which had killed 35 people (34 of them women who had undergone cesarean section) in Durango (city) revealed contamination of bupivacaine with Fusarium solani in 4 batches, used by an anesthesiologist. US news reported however, that the anesthesiologist used multi-dose vials of morphine, which he would administer in more than one patient for his anesthesias in the 4 private hospitals. As of May 26, 2023 WHO had been asked to declare a public health emergency.

As of June 1, 2023, a multistate outbreak of meningitis due to FSSC was ongoing among patients who underwent epidural anesthesia at two clinics in the Mexican city of Matamoros, Tamaulipas, with a total of 212 residents in 25 US states identified as being at risk, two of whom had died.

=== Other animals ===
FSSC is implicated in cutaneous infections of young turtles as well as infections of turtle egg shells. It has also caused infections in Australian crocodile farms, sea lions and grey seals. FSSC is a facultative pathogen of the castor bean tick. It is also lethal to southern pine beetles.

=== Plants ===
FSSC rots the roots of its host plant. It also causes soft rot of plant tissues by penetrating plant cell walls and destroying the torus. It is implicated, along with Pythium myriotylum, in pod rot of the pods of groundnuts. FSSC can cause damping off, corn rot, and root rot, as well as sudden death of soybeans (SDS). It is a very generalistic fungal species and has been known to infect peas, beans, potatoes, and many types of cucurbits. Symptoms include general plant decline, wilting, and large necrotic spots on tap roots.

Recently the pathogen has also done serious damage to olive trees throughout the mediterranean.

Virulence of this agent in plants is controlled by the cutinase genes cut1 and cut2. These genes are upregulated by exposure to the plant's cutin monomers. FSSC is known to cause sudden death syndrome in soybeans, and it is also known to cause disease in other economically important crops such as avocado, citrus, orchids, passion fruit, peas, peppers, potato, and squash.

== Management ==
=== Agriculture ===
The ubiquitous nature of FSSC gives rise to a plethora of management practices developed independently. One particular method is the use of the bacterial complex Burkholderia cepacia, which is a registered control method. This bacterial complex has been shown to produce several types of antibiotics (depending on the strain), and can act as a substitute for chemical pesticides. Precautionary methods include planting during warm/dry weather, 3 plus years of crop rotation of non host species, and avoiding dense seed planting.

=== Humans ===
In the 2023 Matamoros outbreak of "F. solani meningitis", CDC recommended liposomal amphotericin B and voriconazole, however, disease progressed on this regimen, and patients were trialed on fosmanogepix through a compassionate use authorization.

== Biotechnology ==
FSSC has been investigated as a biological control for certain plants including leafy spurge, morning glory, striga, gourd, and water hyacinth.
