= Striga asiatica =

Asiatic witchweed

Scientific classification
- Kingdom: Plantae
- Clade: Embryophytes
- Clade: Tracheophytes
- Clade: Angiosperms
- Clade: Eudicots
- Clade: Asterids
- Order: Lamiales
- Family: Orobanchaceae
- Genus: Striga
- Species: S. asiatica

Binomial name
- Striga asiatica (L.) Kuntze

Synonyms
- Striga lutea

Species of flowering plant

Striga asiatica, the Asiatic witchweed or the red witchweed, is a hemiparasitic plant in the family Orobanchaceae. It is native to Asia and sub-Saharan Africa, but has been introduced into other parts of the world including Australia and the United States. Asiatic witchweed is a serious agricultural pest, as it parasitises important crop species, including corn, rice, sorghum, and sugar cane, often causing substantial yield reductions.

While it is native to Africa and Asia, it is invasive in farmlands of Kenya, Tanzania and Uganda.

In the US, this witchweed was discovered in the Carolinas in 1956. It is considered an invasive agricultural pest, and a vigorous eradication campaign has reduced the affected area by 99% [from 450,000 acres (1,820 km^{2}) to about 3,400 acres (1,400 ha)].

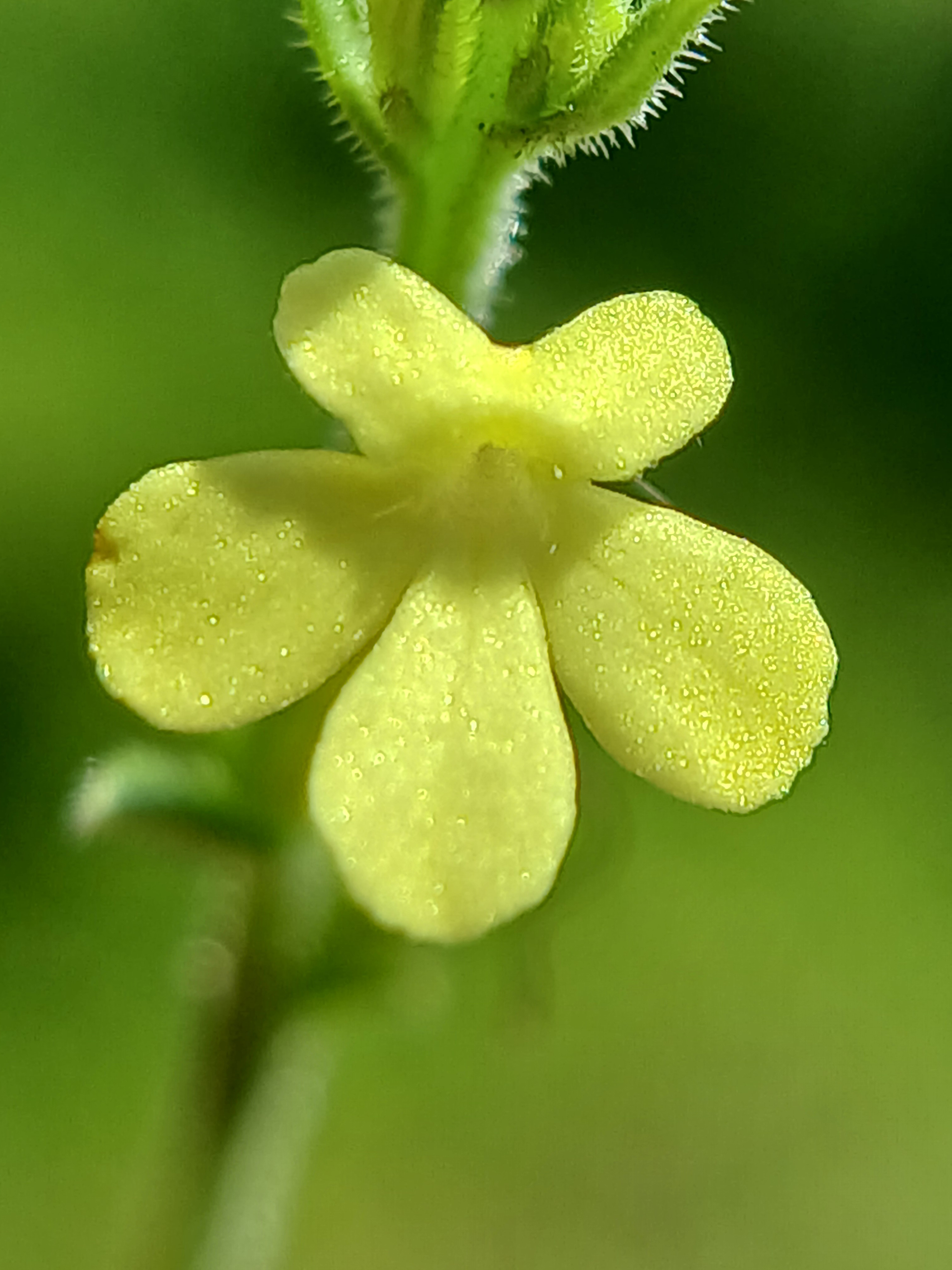
Striga asiatica

Biological control can be achieved by growing a Desmodium (tick-trefoil) undercrop (see push–pull technology). The trefoil can be used as green manure or animal fodder after the harvest.

== Description ==
S. asiatica seedlings are not visible above ground, but white succulent shoots can be found attached to host roots. Mature plants have green foliage above ground, sparsely covered with coarse, short, white, bulbous-based hairs. Mature plants are normally 15–30 centimetres (5.9–11.8 in) tall, but have grown to 60 centimetres (24 in). Leaves are nearly opposite, narrowly lanceolate, about 1–3 centimetres (0.39–1.18 in) long, with successive leaf pairs perpendicular to one another. Flowers, produced in summer and fall, are small (less than 1.5 centimetres (0.59 in) in diameter), sessile and axillary, with a two-lipped corolla, occurring on loose spikes. Flower colour varies regionally, from red, orange, or yellow in Africa to pink, white, yellow, or purple in Asia. The flowers give way to swollen seed pods, each containing thousands of dustlike seeds. Underground stems are white, round with scale-like leaves, turning blue when exposed to air. The roots are succulent, round, without root hairs, and found attached to a host species root system.

== Sources ==
- Simberloff, Daniel. 2003. Eradication - preventing invasions at the outset. Weed Science 51:247–253.
- Striga asiatica in Brunken, U., Schmidt, M., Dressler, S., Janssen, T., Thombiano, A. & Zizka, G. 2008. West African plants - A Photo Guide. Forschungsinstitut Senckenberg, Frankfurt/Main.
