= Fusarubin =

Names
- IUPAC name 3,5,10-trihydroxy-7-methoxy-3-methyl-1,4-dihydrobenzo[g]isochromene-6,9-dione
- Other names Oxyjavanicin

Identifiers
CAS Number	1702-77-8
3D model (JSmol)	Interactive image
ChEMBL	ChEMBL1224816
ChemSpider	66134
PubChem CID	73421
UNII	7O2VQR7EHB
- InChI: InChI=1S/C15H14O7/c1-15(20)4-6-7(5-22-15)13(18)10-8(16)3-9(21-2)14(19)11(10)12(6)17/h3,17-18,20H,4-5H2,1-2H3 Key: FKJXMYJPOKQPSS-UHFFFAOYSA-N
- SMILES: CC1(CC2=C(CO1)C(=C3C(=O)C=C(C(=O)C3=C2O)OC)O)O

Properties
Chemical formula	C_{15}H_{14}O_{7}
Molar mass	306.270 g·mol^{−1}
- Except where otherwise noted, data are given for materials in their standard state (at 25 °C [77 °F], 100 kPa). Infobox references

Fusarubin is a naphthoquinone derived mycotoxin which is produced by the fungi Fusarium solani. Fusarubin has the molecular formula C_{15}H_{14}O_{7}.
