= Manogepix =

Chemical compound

Clinical data
- Pronunciation: /mənˈoʊdʒɛpɪks/ mən-OH-jep-iks
- Other names: E1210, APX001A
- ATC code: None

Identifiers
- IUPAC name: 3-(3-(4-((pyridin-2-yloxy)methyl)benzyl)isoxazol-5-yl)pyridin-2-amine
- CAS Number: 936339-60-5
- PubChem CID: 16719049
- ChemSpider: 17623449
- UNII: 7B1P18ID9L
- ChEMBL: ChEMBL4533578
- CompTox Dashboard (EPA): DTXSID601045473

Chemical and physical data
- Formula: C_{12}H_{18}N_{4}O_{2}
- Molar mass: 250.302 g·mol^{−1}
- 3D model (JSmol): Interactive image
- SMILES: c1ccnc(c1)OCc2ccc(cc2)Cc3cc(on3)c4cccnc4N
- InChI: InChI=1S/C21H18N4O2/c22-21-18(4-3-11-24-21)19-13-17(25-27-19)12-15-6-8-16(9-7-15)14-26-20-5-1-2-10-23-20/h1-11,13H,12,14H2,(H2,22,24); Key:WSEKTEUGRLFBSE-UHFFFAOYSA-N

Manogepix (E1210) is an pyridine-isoxazole-based broad-spectrum antifungal. Manogepix targets an enzyme involved in the post-translational modification of fungal proteins.

Manogepix is the active metabolite of the prodrug fosmanogepix.
