= Fosmanogepix =

Chemical compound

Clinical data
- Pronunciation: /ˌfɒsmənˈoʊdʒɛpɪks/ FOS-mən-OH-jep-iks
- Other names: APX001, APX-001
- ATC code: None

Legal status
- Legal status: Investigational

Identifiers
- IUPAC name: [2-Amino-3-(3-{4-[(2-pyridinyloxy)methyl]benzyl}-1,2-oxazol-5-yl)-1-pyridiniumyl]methyl hydrogen phosphate
- CAS Number: 2091769-17-2
- PubChem CID: 44123754
- DrugBank: 15183
- ChemSpider: 64853722
- UNII: 1XQ871489P
- KEGG: D11694

Chemical and physical data
- Formula: C_{22}H_{21}N_{4}O_{6}P
- Molar mass: 468.406 g·mol^{−1}
- 3D model (JSmol): Interactive image
- SMILES: c1ccnc(c1)OCc2ccc(cc2)Cc3cc(on3)c4ccc[n+](c4N)COP(=O)(O)[O-]
- InChI: InChI=1S/C22H21N4O6P/c23-22-19(4-3-11-26(22)15-31-33(27,28)29)20-13-18(25-32-20)12-16-6-8-17(9-7-16)14-30-21-5-1-2-10-24-21/h1-11,13,23H,12,14-15H2,(H2,27,28,29); Key:JQONJQKKVAHONF-UHFFFAOYSA-N

Fosmanogepix is an experimental antifungal drug being developed by Amplyx Pharmaceuticals (now currently by Pfizer and Basilea) It is being investigated for its potential to treat various fungal infections including aspergillosis, candidaemia, and coccidioidomycosis.

Fosmanogepix is a prodrug and is converted into the active drug form, manogepix in vivo. Manogepix targets the enzyme glycosylphosphatidylinositol-anchored wall protein transfer 1 (GWT1), an enzyme in the glycosylphosphatidylinositol biosynthesis pathway. Inhibiting this enzyme prevents the fungi from properly modifying certain (so called GPI-anchored) proteins essential to the fungal life cycle. This mechanism of action is totally novel; therefore, if approved, fosmanogepix would become a first-in-class medication.

In 2023, the drug was given a compassionate use authorization for four patients with Fusarium solani meningitis.
