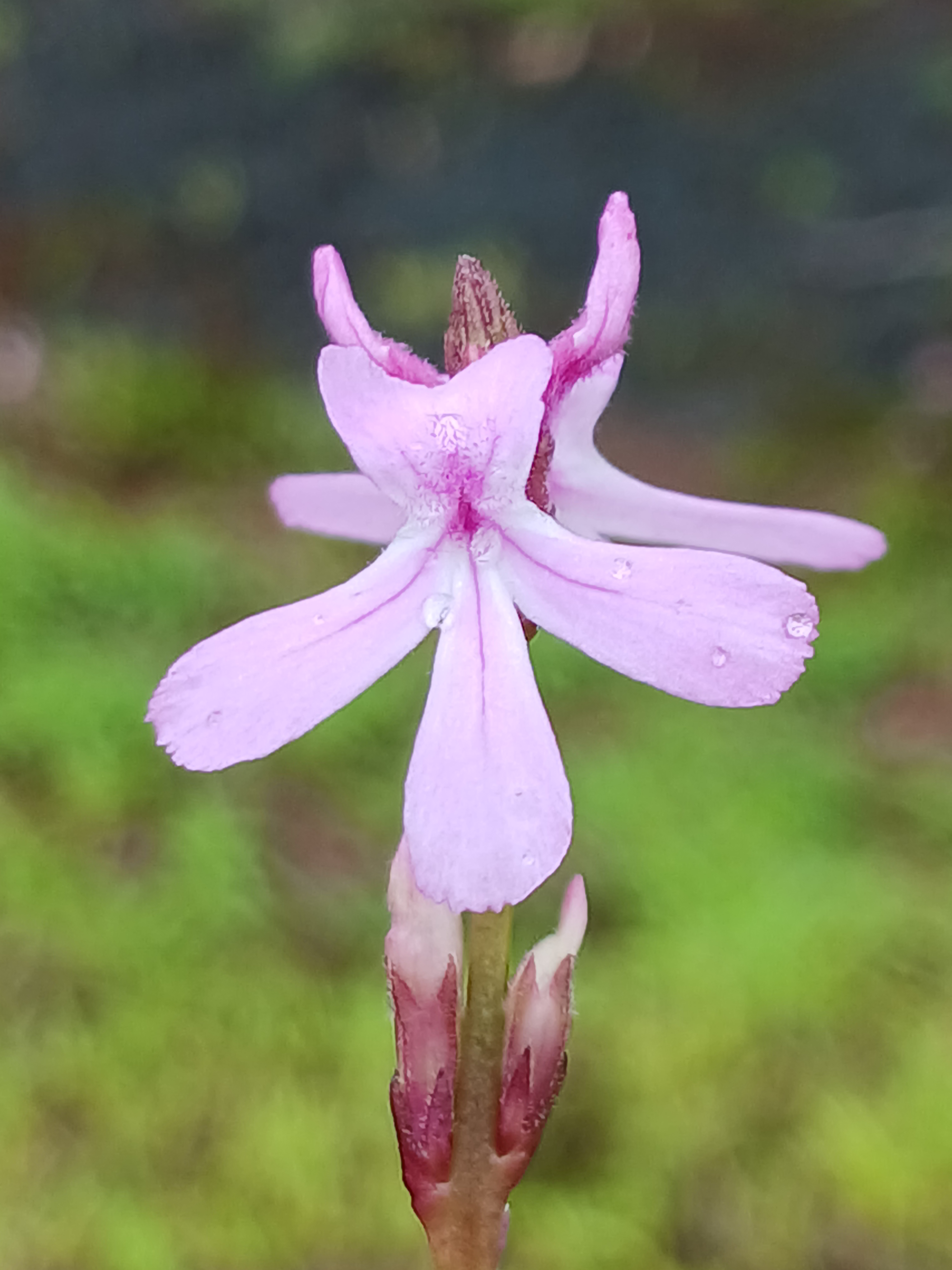
- Close-up of flowers
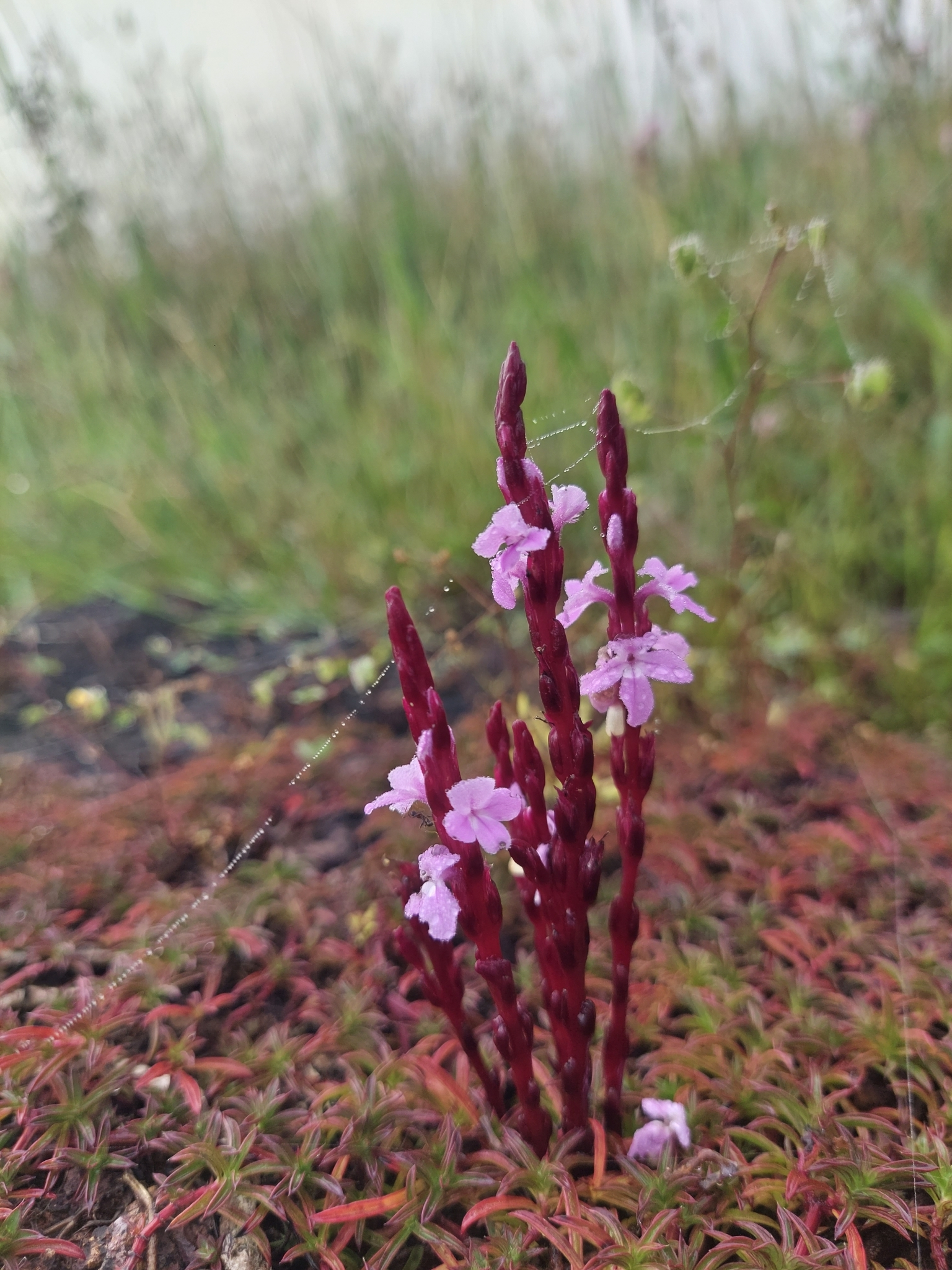
- Habit

Scientific classification
- Kingdom: Plantae
- Clade: Embryophytes
- Clade: Tracheophytes
- Clade: Angiosperms
- Clade: Eudicots
- Clade: Asterids
- Order: Lamiales
- Family: Orobanchaceae
- Genus: Striga
- Species: S. gesnerioides

Binomial name
- Striga gesnerioides (Willd.) Vatke

Synonyms
- List: Buchnera gesnerioides Willd.; Buchnera hydrabadensis Roth; Buchnera orobanchoides R.Br. ex Endl.; Campuleia coerulea Bojer ex Benth.; Campuleia rosea Bojer ex Benth.; Chorobanche indica C.Presl; Harveya varia Hook. ex Steud.; Microsyphus parviflorus C.Presl; Orobanche indica Spreng.; Orobanche varia E.Mey. ex Steud.; Psammostachys varia C.Presl; Striga chloroleuca Dinter; Striga gesnerioides var. arondensis M.R.Almeida; Striga gesnerioides var. minor Santapau; Striga orchidea Hochst. ex Benth.; Striga orobanchoides (R.Br. ex Endl.) Benth.; Striga scottiana Jeeva, Shyn.Brintha & Rasingam

= Striga gesnerioides =

Species of plant

Striga gesnerioides, the cowpea witchweed, also called the indigo, purple, or tobacco witchweed, is a species of flowering plant in the family Orobanchaceae. It is native to Africa, the Arabian Peninsula, and the Indian Subcontinent, and it has been introduced to Florida. An erect subshrub, it is found in the seasonally dry tropics. As its common name suggests, it is a serious root hemiparasite of cowpea (Vigna unguiculata), and related species, especially affecting subsistence farmers.

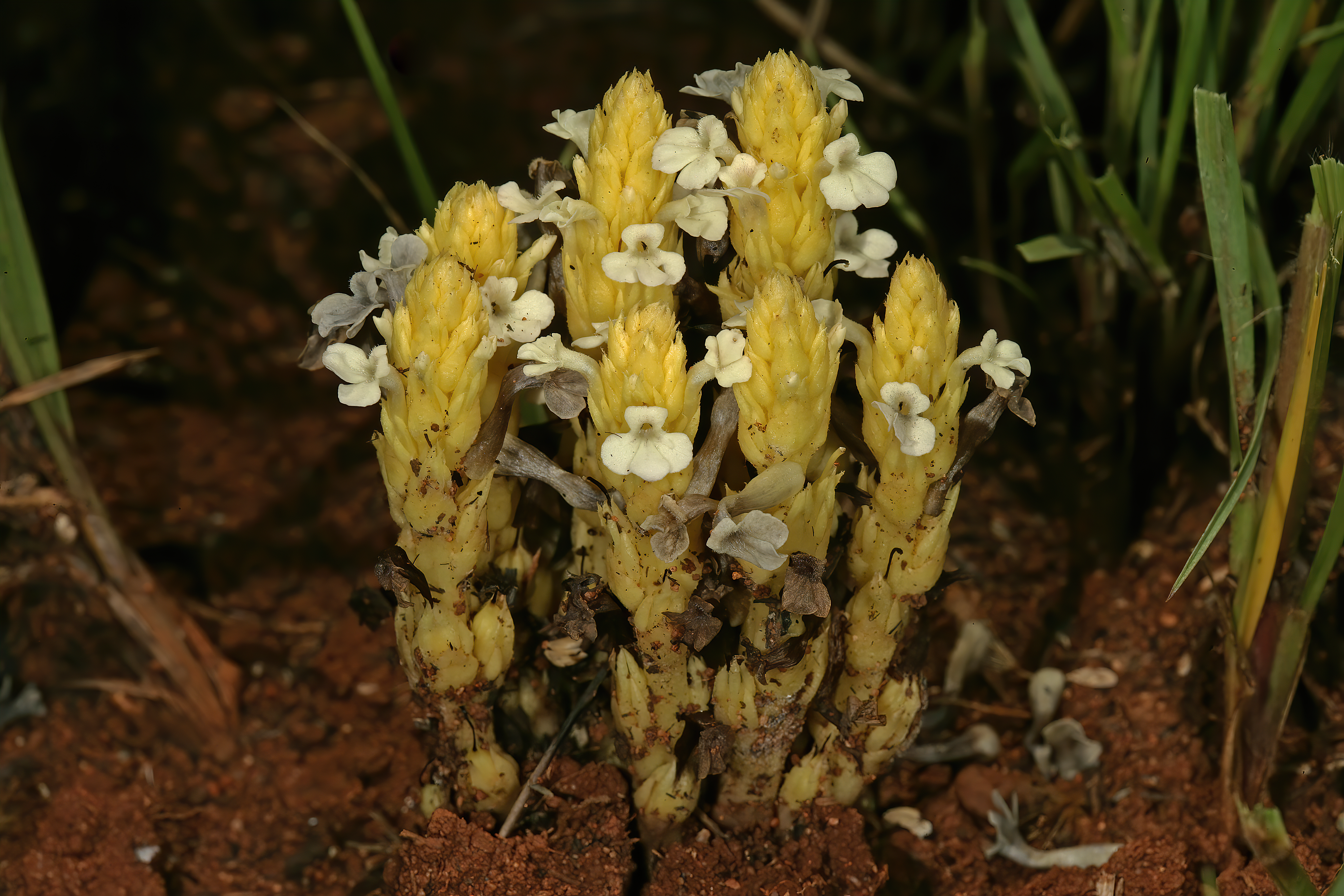
A morph with no chlorophyll, possibly indicating transition to holoparasitism

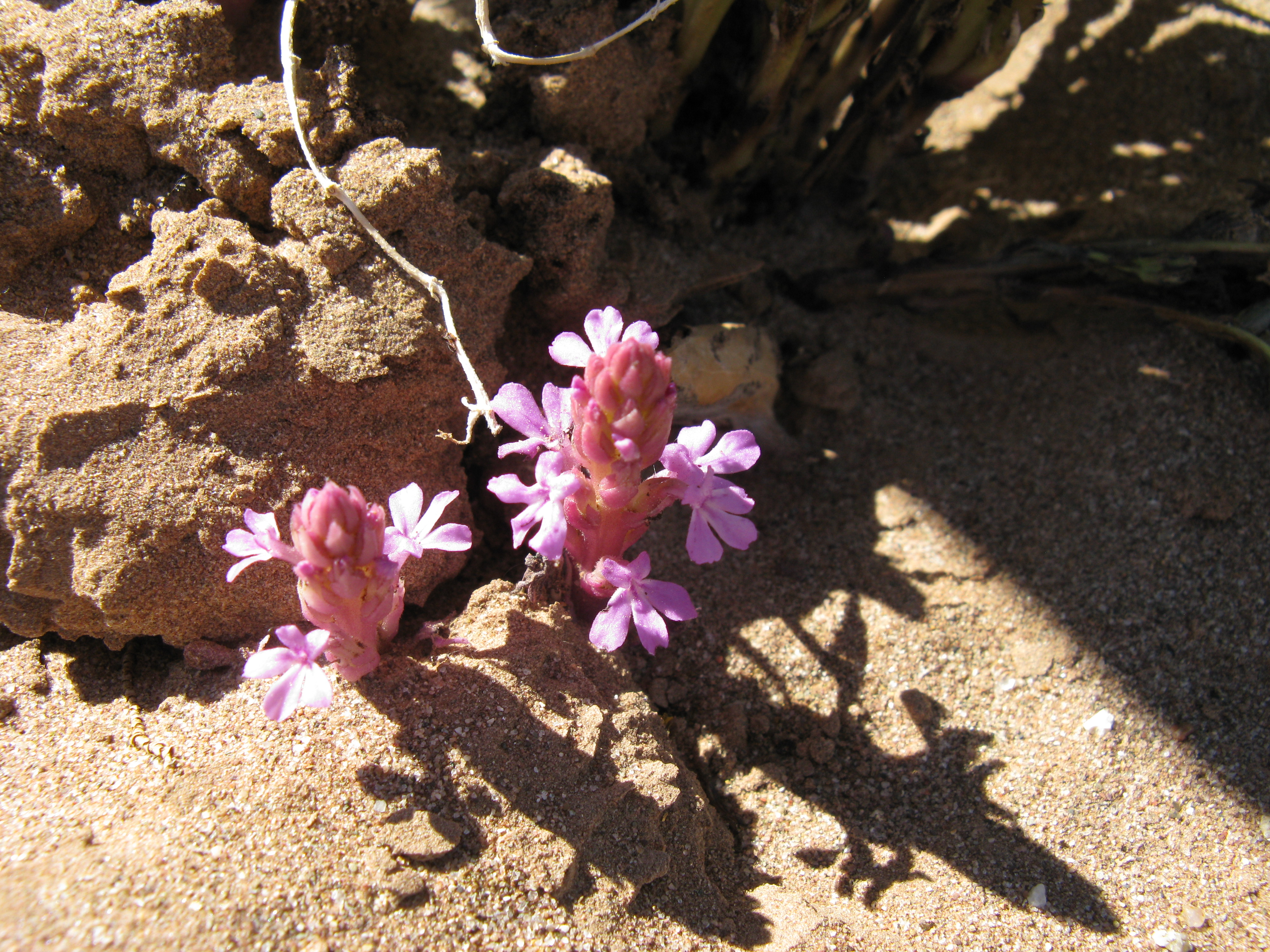
A pink morph

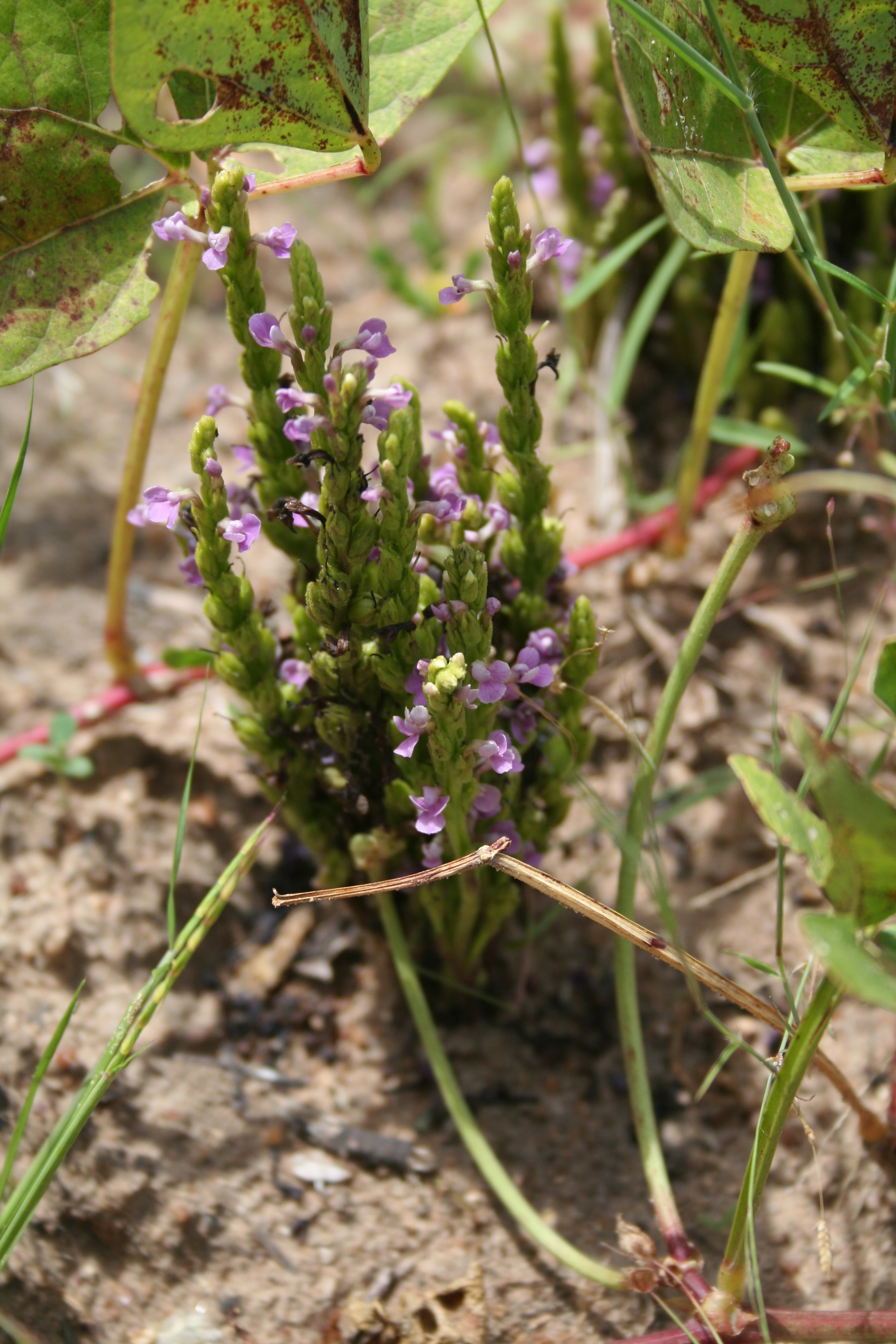
A green morph
