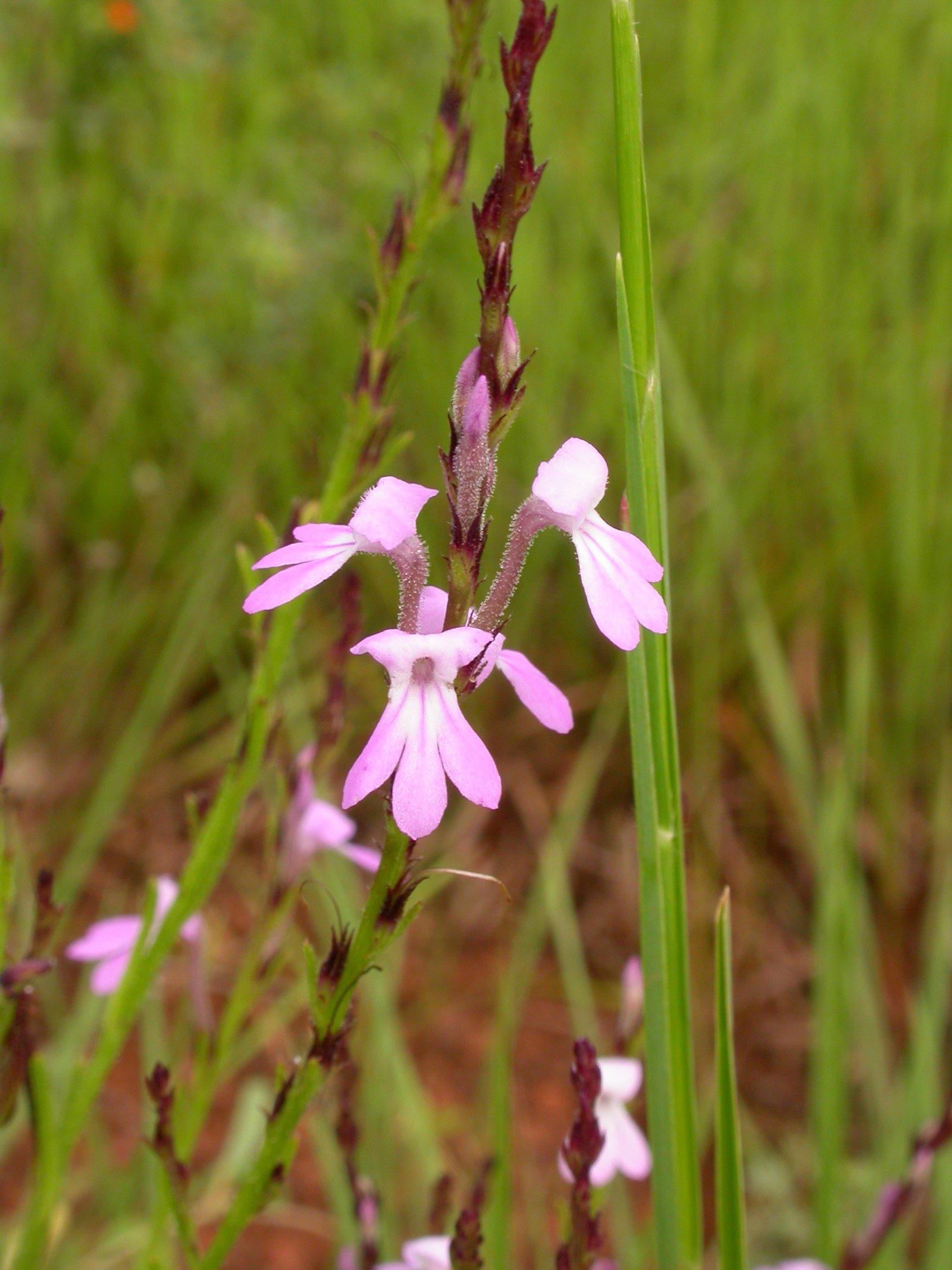

Scientific classification
- Kingdom: Plantae
- Clade: Tracheophytes
- Clade: Angiosperms
- Clade: Eudicots
- Clade: Asterids
- Order: Lamiales
- Family: Orobanchaceae
- Tribe: Buchnereae
- Genus: Striga; Lour.

Synonyms
- Campuleia Thouars; Microsyphus C.Presl; Psammostachys C.Presl; Camphyleia Spreng.

= Striga =

Genus of flowering plants in the broomrape family

For the Roman army barracks-block, see Castra#List of Latin terms.

Striga, commonly known as witchweed, is a genus of parasitic plants that occur naturally in parts of Africa, Asia, and Australia. It is currently classified in the family Orobanchaceae, although older classifications place it in the Scrophulariaceae. Some species are serious pathogens of cereal crops, with the greatest effects being in savanna agriculture in Africa. It also causes considerable crop losses in other regions, including other tropical and subtropical crops in its native range and in the Americas. The generic name derives from Latin strī̆ga, "witch".

Witchweeds are characterized by bright-green stems and leaves and small, brightly colored and attractive flowers. They are obligate hemiparasites of roots and require a living host for germination and initial development, though they can then survive on their own.

The number of species is uncertain, but may exceed 40 by some counts.

== Hosts and symptoms ==
Although most species of Striga are not pathogens that affect agriculture, some species have devastating effects upon crops, particularly those planted by subsistence farmers. Crops most commonly affected are maize, sorghum, rice and sugarcane. Three species cause the most damage: Striga asiatica, S. gesnerioides, and S. hermonthica.

Witchweed parasitizes maize, millet, sorghum, sugarcane, rice, legumes, and a range of weedy grasses. It is capable of significantly reducing yields, in some cases wiping out the entire crop.

Host plant symptoms, such as stunting, wilting, and chlorosis, are similar to those seen from severe drought damage, nutrient deficiency, and vascular disease.

== Lifecycle ==
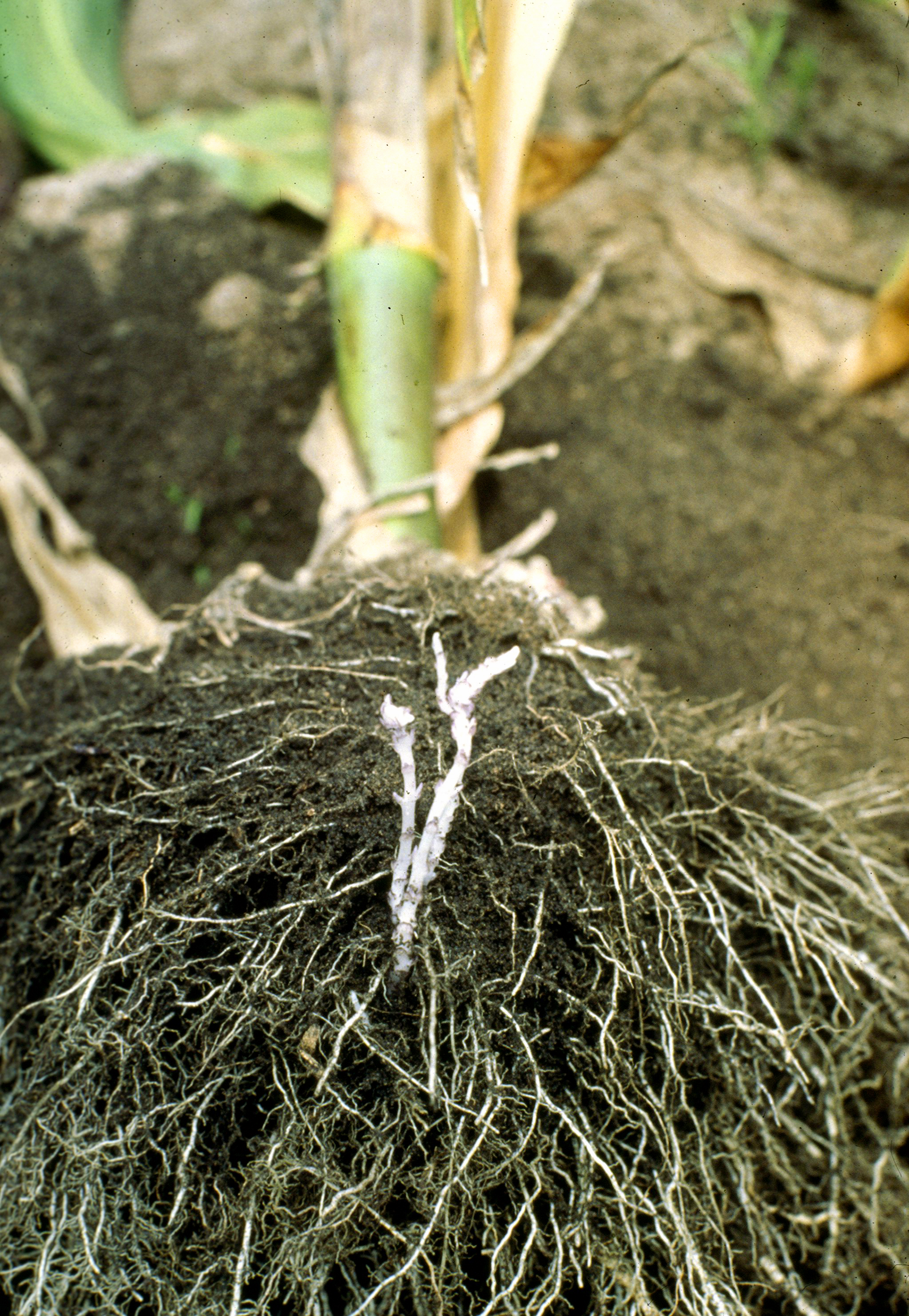
Plant roots with connected Striga plant

Each plant is capable of producing between 90,000 and 500,000 seeds, which may remain viable in the soil for over 10 years. Most seeds produced are not viable. An annual plant, witchweed overwinters in the seed stage. Its seeds germinate in the presence of host root exudate, and develop haustoria which penetrate host root cells. Host root exudate contain strigolactones, signaling molecules that promote Striga seed germination. A bell-like swelling forms where the parasitic roots attach to the roots of the host. The pathogen develops underground, where it may spend the next four to seven weeks before emergence, when it rapidly flowers and produces seeds. Witchweed seeds spread readily via wind and water, and in soil via animal vectors. The chief means of dispersal, however, is through human activity, by means of machinery, tools, and clothing.

=== Haustoria development ===
Once germination is stimulated, the Striga seed sends out an initial root to probe the soil for the host root. The initial root secretes an oxidizing enzyme that digests the host root surface, releasing quinones. If the quinone product is at the appropriate concentrations, a haustorium will develop from the initial root. The haustorium grows toward the host root until it makes contact with the root surface, establishing parasitic contact in relatively short order. Within 12 hours of initial haustorium growth, the haustorium recognizes the host root and begins rapid cell division and elongation. The haustorium forms a wedge shape and uses mechanical force and chemical digestion to penetrate the host root, pushing the host cells out of the way. Within 48–72 hours, the haustorium has penetrated the host root cortex. Finger-like structures on the haustorium, called oscula (from Latin osculum, "little mouth") penetrate the host xylem through pits in the membrane. The oscula then swell to secure their position within the xylem membrane. Striga sieve tubes develop along with the oscula. Shortly after the host xylem is penetrated, Striga sieve tubes develop and approach the host phloem within eight cells. This eight cell layer allows for nonspecific nutrient transport from the host to the Striga seedling. Within 24 hours after tapping the host xylem and phloem, the Striga cotyledons emerge from the seed.

== Environment ==
Temperatures ranging from 30 to 35 °C (86 to 95 °F) in a moist environment are ideal for germination. Witchweed will not develop in temperatures below 20 °C (68 °F). Agricultural soils with a light texture and low nitrogen levels tend to favor development. Still, witchweed has demonstrated a wide tolerance for soil types if soil temperatures are favorably high. Seeds have been shown to survive in frozen soil of temperatures as low as −15 °C (5 °F), attesting to their aptitude as overwintering structures.

Soil temperature, air temperature, photoperiod, soil type, and soil nutrient and moisture levels do not greatly deter the development of witchweed. These findings, while limited to the Carolinas in the United States, seem to suggest that the pathogen could successfully infect the massive corn crops of the American Midwest.

== Management ==
Management of witchweed is difficult because the majority of its life cycle takes place below ground. If it is not detected before emergence, it is too late to reduce crop losses. To prevent witchweed from spreading it is necessary to plant uncontaminated seeds and to clean soil and plant debris off of machinery, shoes, clothing, and tools before entering fields. If populations are low, hand weeding before seeds are produced is an option.

Striga in the United States has been controlled through the use of several management strategies, including quarantines imposed on affected areas, control of movement of farm equipment between infected and uninfected areas, herbicide application, and imposed "suicidal germination". For the latter, in fields not yet planted in crops, seeds present in the soil are induced to germinate by injecting ethylene gas, which mimics the natural physiological response tied to host recognition. Because no host roots are available, the seedlings die. However, each mature Striga plant can produce tens of thousands of tiny seeds, which may remain dormant in the soil for many years. Thus, such treatments do not remove all seeds from the soil. Moreover, this method is expensive and not generally available to farmers in developing nations of Africa and Asia.

Another method called trap cropping involves planting a species in an infested field that will induce the Striga seeds to germinate but will not support attachment of the parasite. This method has been used in sorghum plantations by planting Celosia argentea between the sorghum rows. Cotton, sunflower and linseed are also effective trap crops. Planting silverleaf desmodium (Desmodium uncinatum), as is done in push-pull intercropping, inhibits Striga seed germination and has worked effectively intercropped with maize.

Increasing nitrogen levels in the soil, growing Striga-tolerant varieties, trap-cropping, and planting susceptible crops harvested before witchweed seed is produced, are proven tactics. Coating maize seeds with fungi or a herbicide also appears to be a promising approach. An example is TAN222, the "Striga-resistant" maize variety which is coated with the systemic herbicide imazapyr, to which it is resistant. Any witchweed seeds sprouting when this maize is in the seedling stage are poisoned when their haustoria embed in the seedling's roots.

Several sorghum varieties have high levels of resistance in local conditions, including 'N-13', 'Framida', and 'Serena'. 'Buruma', 'Shibe', 'Okoa' and 'Serere 17' millet cultivars are considered to be resistant in Tanzania. Some maize varieties show partial resistance to witchweed, including 'Katumani' in Kenya. In a number of rice cultivars, including some cultivars of NERICA (New Rice for Africa), effective pre- and post- attachment resistance mechanisms have been identified. 'StrigAway' herbicide-resistant, herbicide-impregnated maize has been shown to reduce the seed bank by 30% in two seasons.

== Importance ==
Maize, sorghum, and sugarcane crops affected by witchweed in the United States have an estimated value well over $20 billion. Furthermore, witchweed is capable of wiping out an entire crop. It is so prolific that in 1957 the US Congress allocated money in an attempt to eradicate witchweed. Because of Striga, the Animal and Plant Health Inspection Service (APHIS) of the U.S. Department of Agriculture established a research station and control methods. Through infestation mapping, quarantine, and control activities such as contaminated seed destruction, the acreage parasitized by witchweed has been reduced by 99% since its discovery in the United States. APHIS has even offered cash rewards those who identify and report the weed, and encourages landowners to check their own acreage.

Parasitizing important economic plants, witchweed is one of the most destructive pathogens in Africa. Witchweed affects 40% of Africa's arable savanna region, resulting in up to $13 billion lost every year. Striga affects 40 million hectares (98,842,153 acres) of crops in sub-Saharan Africa alone. In parts of Africa, the witchweed infestation is so severe that some farmers must relocate every few years. The majority of crops in Africa are grown by subsistence farmers who cannot afford expensive witchweed controls, who therefore suffer much as a result of this pathogen.

== Species ==
=== Common crop parasites ===
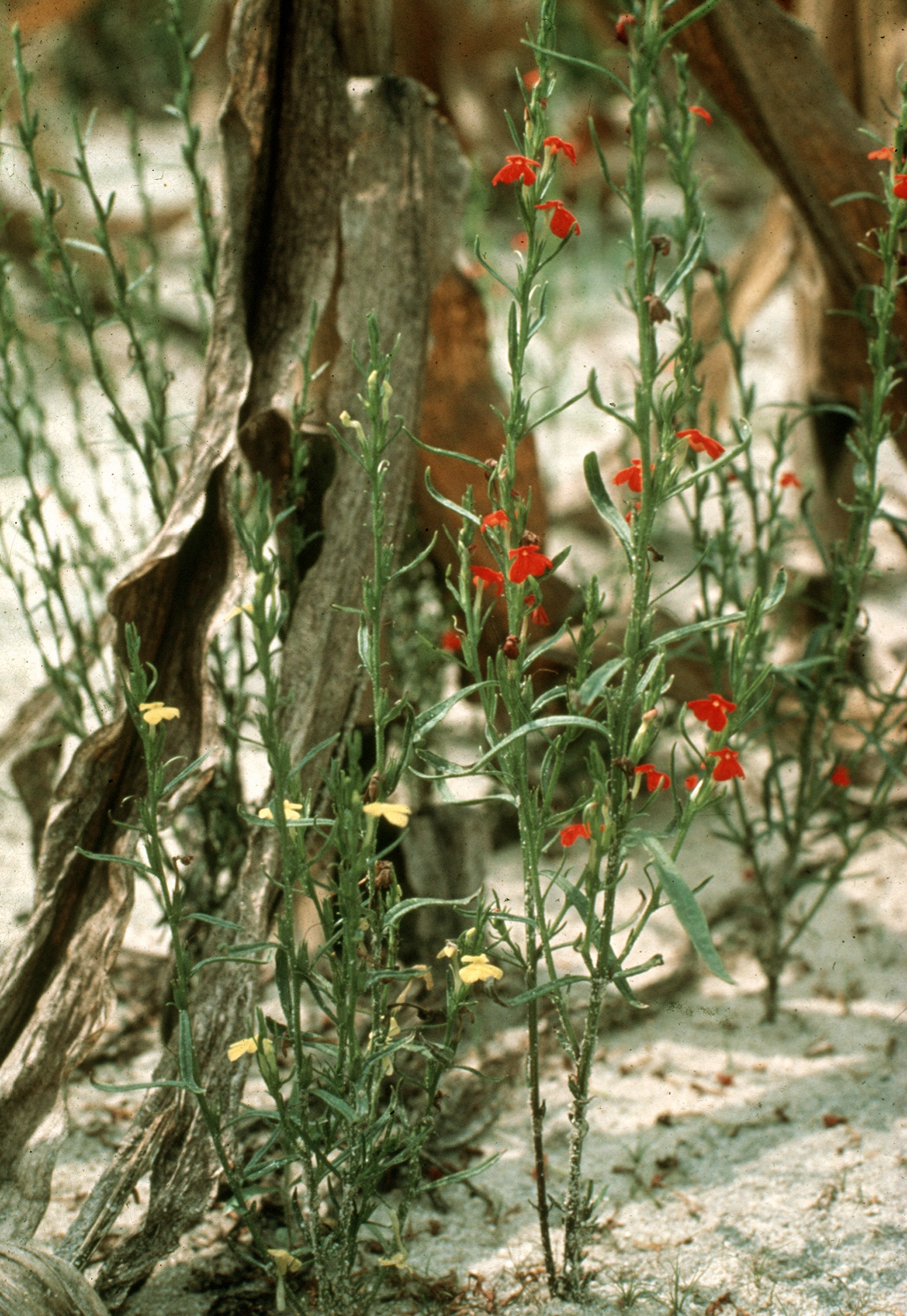
Striga asiatica

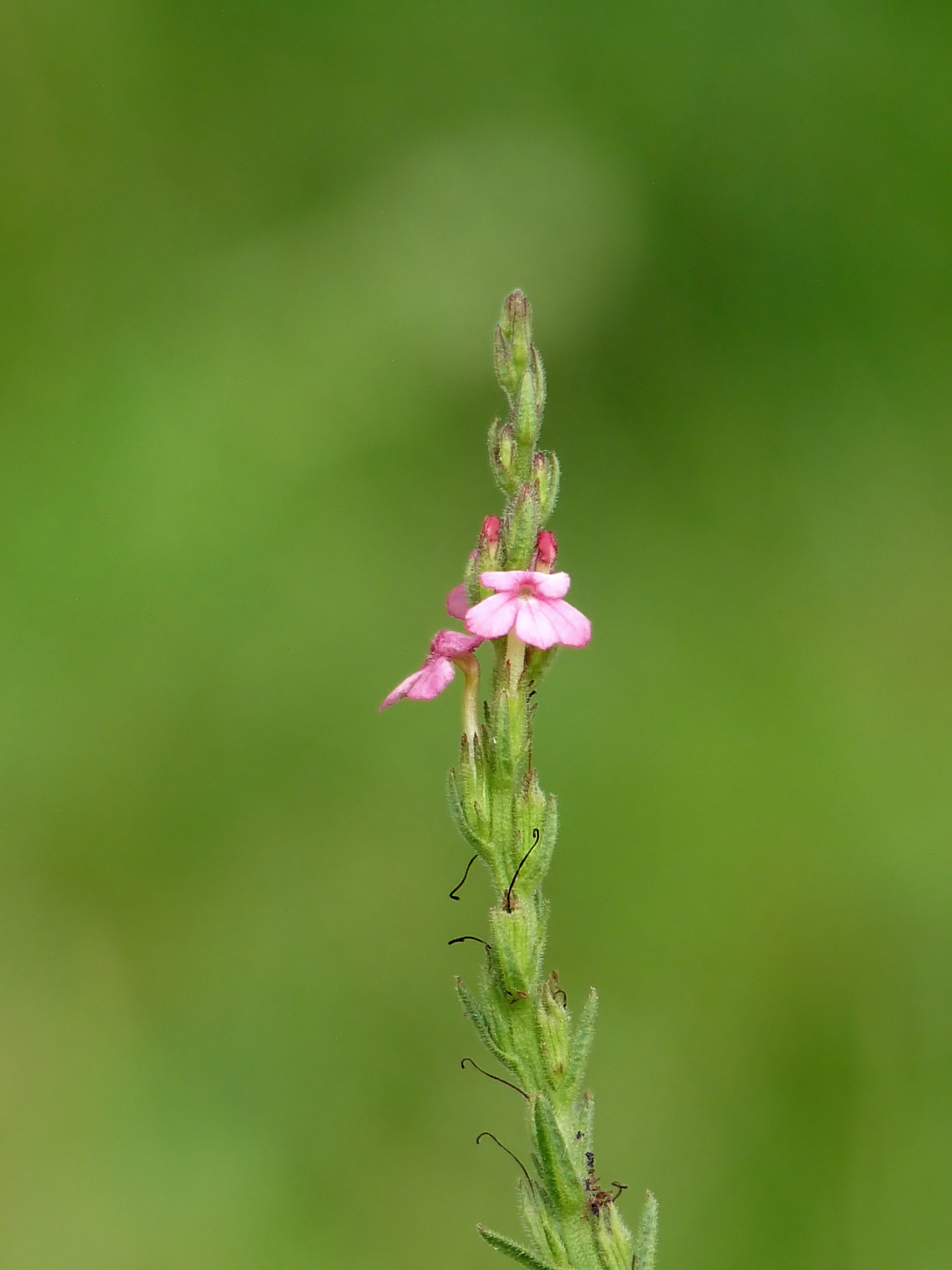
Striga bilabiata

- Striga asiatica has a very wide geographic distribution, from Africa through southern and eastern Asia to Australia. Since the 1950s, it is also known from the United States. This introduction, likely a result of human activity, resulted in an infestation on corn (maize) across many counties in North and South Carolina. The United States Department of Agriculture and state agencies imposed a quarantine on this area to control its spread—a process that was apparently successful.
- Striga gesnerioides, cowpea witchweed, as its name implies, is a parasite of cowpea (Vigna unguiculata), which is not a grass, but a member of the legume family (Fabaceae or Leguminosae). This species was also accidentally introduced into Florida in the United States, where it was found parasitizing Indigofera hirsuta (hairy indigo, another legume).
- Striga hermonthica (purple witchweed) is also a parasite that affects grasses, particularly sorghum and pearl millet in sub-Saharan Africa (Senegal to Ethiopia, Democratic Republic of Congo and Tanzania, Angola, Namibia).

=== Species list ===
The following species are recognised in the genus Striga:

- Striga aequinoctialis A.Chev. ex Hutch. & Dalziel – West Africa
- Striga alba Pennell
- Striga angolensis K.I.Mohamed & Musselman – Angola
- Striga angustifolia (D.Don) C.J.Saldanha – East Africa, Asia, Indonesia
- Striga asiatica (L.) Kuntze – (Asiatic witchweed) Africa, Arabian peninsula, India, Burma, China, Indonesia, the Philippines, Malaysia, New Guinea, Australia (introduced?), USA (introduced)
- Striga aspera (Willd.) Benth. – Africa
- Striga barthlottii Eb.Fisch., Lobin & Mutke
- Striga baumannii Engl.
- Striga bilabiata (Thunb.) Kuntze – Africa
- Striga brachycalyx Skan – Africa
- Striga chrysantha A.Raynal
- Striga crispata Sheng Z.Yang, Zi X.Chen, Chien F.Chen & P.H.Chen
- Striga curviflora (R.Br.) Benth.
- Striga dalzielii Hutch. – West Africa
- Striga densiflora (Benth.) Benth.
- Striga dewevrei De Wild. & T.Durand
- Striga diversifolia Pires de Lima
- Striga elegans Benth. – Angola, Malawi, South Africa, Zimbabwe
- Striga ellenbergeri A.Raynal
- Striga flava Miq.
- Striga forbesii Benth. – Africa, Madagascar
- Striga fulgens (Engl.) Hepper
- Striga gastonii A.Raynal
- Striga gesnerioides (Willd.) Vatke – (cowpea witchweed) Africa, Arabian peninsula, India, USA (introduced)
- Striga glumacea A.Raynal
- Striga gracillima Melch.
- Striga hallaei A.Raynal
- Striga hermonthica (Delile) Benth. – Senegal to Ethiopia, Democratic Republic of Congo and Tanzania, Angola, Namibia
- Striga indica K.M.P.Kumar, P.Jayanthi, A.Rajendran & M.Sabu
- Striga junodii Schinz – South Africa, Mozambique
- Striga kamalii Omalsree, K.M.P.Kumar, M.Sabu & Sunojk.
- Striga klingii (Engl.) Skan – West Africa, Nigeria, Ghana, Cameroon, Togo
- Striga latericea Vatke – East Africa, Ethiopia, Somalia
- Striga lepidagathidis A.Raynal
- Striga linearifolia (Schumach. & Thonn.) Hepper
- Striga lutea Lour.
- Striga macrantha (Benth.) Benth. – West Africa, Nigeria, Ivory Coast, Togo
- Striga magnibracteata Eb.Fisch. & I.Darbysh.
- Striga masuria (Buch.-Ham. ex Benth.) Benth.
- Striga micrantha A.Rich.
- Striga multiflora Benth.
- Striga musselmanii Omalsree & V.K.Sreenivas
- Striga parviflora (R.Br.) Benth.
- Striga passargei Engl. – West and Central Africa, Arabian peninsula
- Striga pinnatifida Getachew
- Striga primuloides A.Chev. – Ivory Coast, Nigeria
- Striga pubiflora Klotzsch – Somalia
- Striga schlechteri Pennell
- Striga spanogheana Miq.
- Striga squamigera W.R.Barker
- Striga strigosa R.D.Good
- Striga sulphurea Dalzell
- Striga yemenica Musselman & Hepper

== Gallery ==
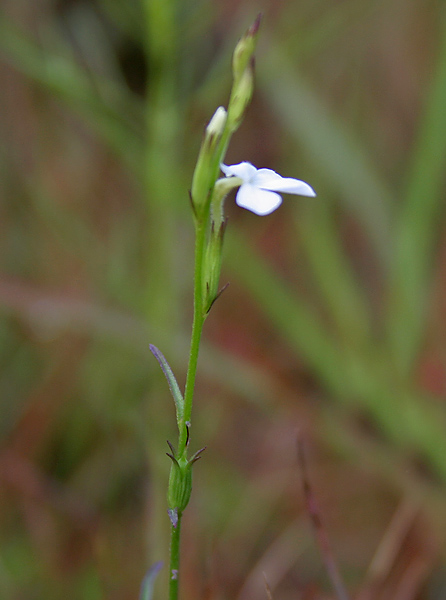
Striga densiflora in Hyderabad, India

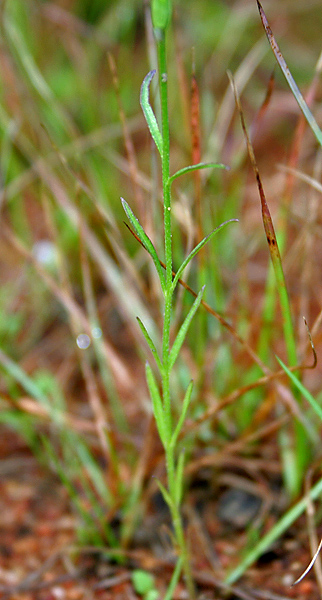
Striga densiflora in Hyderabad

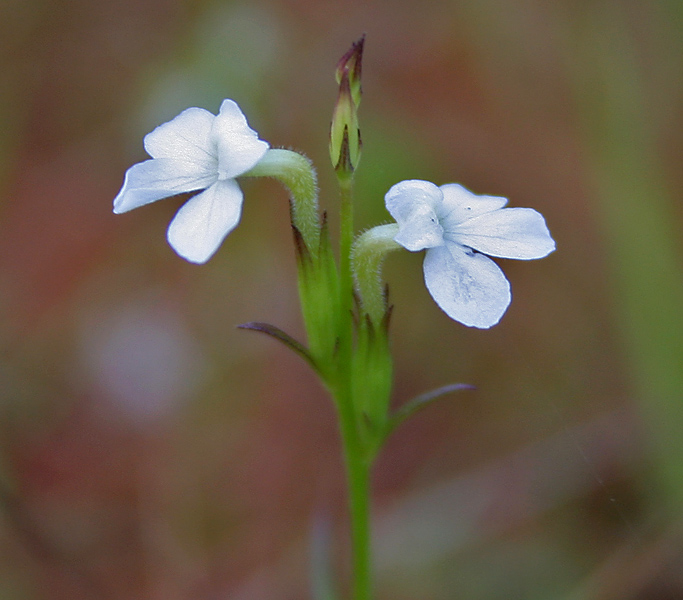
Striga densiflora in Hyderabad

== See also ==
- Push–pull technology
