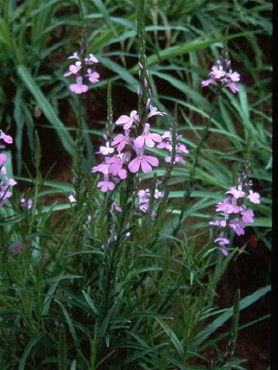
- Striga hermonthica flowers

Scientific classification
- Kingdom: Plantae
- Clade: Embryophytes
- Clade: Tracheophytes
- Clade: Angiosperms
- Clade: Eudicots
- Clade: Asterids
- Order: Lamiales
- Family: Orobanchaceae
- Genus: Striga
- Species: S. hermonthica

Binomial name
- Striga hermonthica (Delile) Benth.

= Striga hermonthica =

Purple witchweed

Species of flowering plant

Striga hermonthica, commonly known as purple witchweed or giant witchweed, is a hemiparasitic plant that belongs to the family Orobanchaceae. It is devastating to major crops such as sorghum (Sorghum bicolor) and rice (Oryza sativa). In sub-Saharan Africa, apart from sorghum and rice, it also infests maize (Zea mays), pearl millet (Pennisetum glaucum), and sugar cane (Saccharum officinarum).

Striga hermonthica has undergone horizontal gene transfer from Sorghum to its nuclear genome. The S. hermonthica gene, ShContig9483, is most like a Sorghum bicolor gene, and additionally shows significant but lesser similarity to a gene from Oryza sativa. It shows no similarity to any known eudicot gene.

== Host and symptoms ==
Purple witchweed infects a variety of grasses and legumes in sub-saharan Africa, including rice, maize, millet, sugarcane, and cowpea. The symptoms mimic that of drought or nutrient-deficiency symptoms. Chlorosis, wilt, and stunting result from witchweed's ability to extract nutrients from its host. Pre-emergence symptoms are difficult to diagnose secondary to their similarity to general lack of nutrients. Once emergence of the plant has taken place, damage has become too severe to mitigate.

== Parasitic cycle ==
Seeds of witchweed overwinter in the soil after they are dispersed by wind, water, animals, or human machinery. When the environment is correct, and if the seed is within a few centimeters of the host root, it will begin to germinate. The germinating plant grows towards hormones, called strigolactones, released from the host root. The plant grows up the concentration gradient of these strigolactones. In the absence of strigolactone, the seed will not germinate. Strigolactone knockout plants have been used in an attempt to prevent infection by avoiding germination. Once in contact with the root, the witchweed produces a haustorium establishing a parasitic relationship with the plant. It remains underground for several weeks while extracting nutrients. The stem while underground is round and white. After this stage, it emerges from the ground and rapidly flowers and produces seeds. The flowers self pollinate before opening. After emergence, the plant can perform photosynthesis to augment its metabolic demands.

== Environment ==
Witchweed's ideal temperature for germination is 30-35 °C. Below 20 °C, the seeds will not germinate. Seeds can survive freezing temperatures. However, the longevity of the seed is debated. Most say that under ideal conditions, seeds can remain viable up to 14 years, but wet soils greatly decrease the resilience of the seeds. At most in one year, 74% of viable seeds were lost secondary to wet soil.

== Management ==
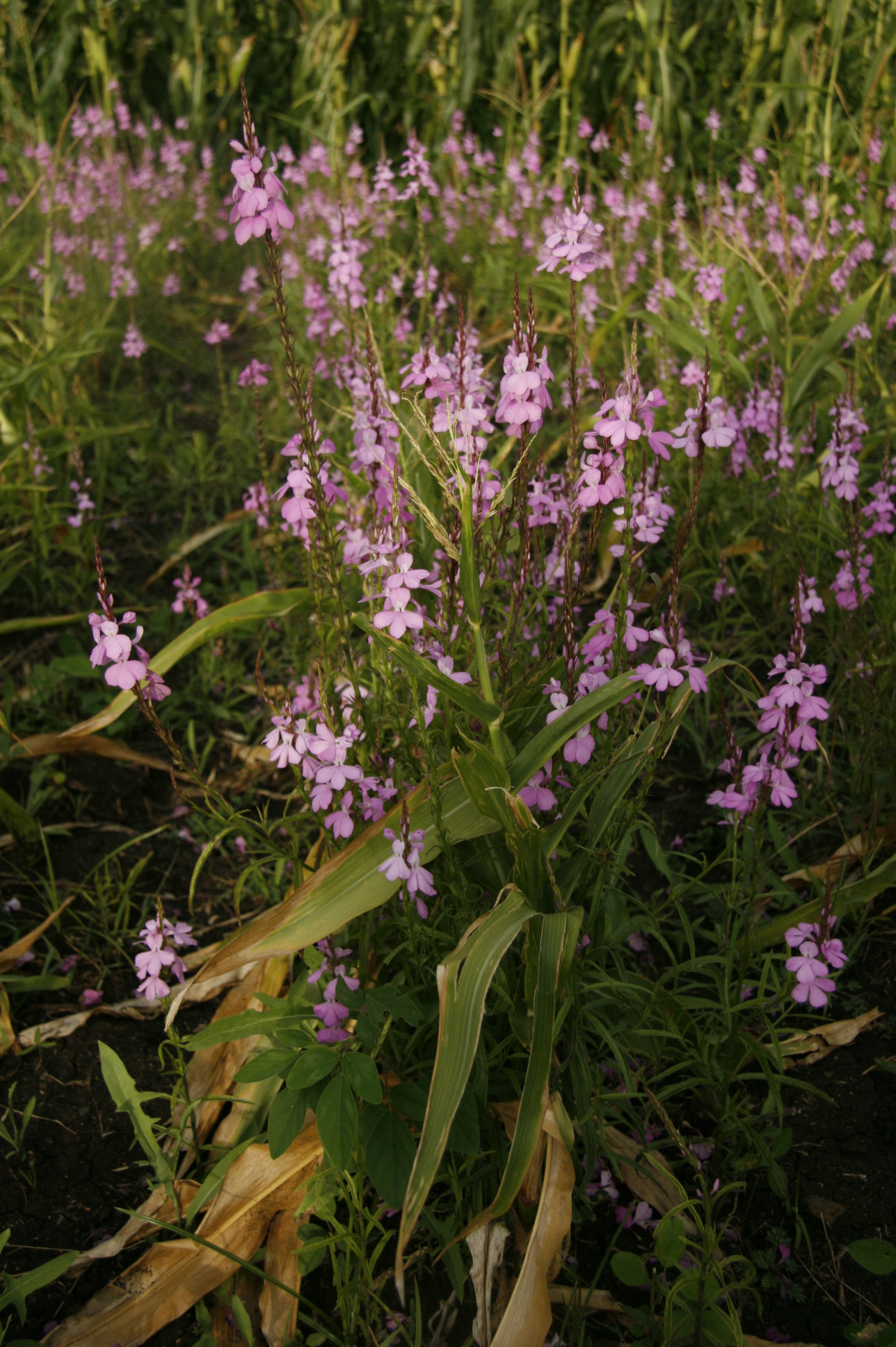
Striga hermonthica growing in maize field in Kenya

=== Biocontrol ===
Witchweed is historically among the hardest parasitic plants to control. Fusarium oxysporum may be used as a possible biocontrol of witchweed and its host specificity makes it a good candidate. This fungus is thought to infect the early vasculature of the Striga plant. Applying native strains of Fusarium oxysporum has not shown adequate crop restoration. However, using strains selected for their ability to over-produce specific amino acids has shown highly effective results. Data on 500 Striga-infested farms were obtained in paired plot trials over two growing seasons in 2014–2015, using hybrid seed and fertilizer compared to hybrid seed, fertilizer and FoxyT14 (a trio of the virulence-enhanced strains for Fusarium). Most (99.6%) of the farmers had equal or greater yield in their Foxy T14 plots relative to yield in their comparable farmer-practice plots without Foxy T14. The average maize yield in the March–June rains season was increased by 56.5% in Foxy T14 plots relative to the farmer-practice plots (p < 0.0001, pair-wise t-test). Approximately one third of the farmers doubled their yield in this test. This technology development is called The Toothpick Project based on mechanism used to deliver the fungal strains to smallholder farmers via a toothpick, where the farmer can make a fresh, on-farm inoculum by growing the fungal strains on cooked rice. The project is being launched in Kenya and a team of scientists in eleven other countries is working on isolating local strains for development.

=== Herbicide priming ===
Another potential solution to purple witchweed for millet and sorghum crops is herbicide priming. When herbicide-resistant seeds were soaked in herbicidal chemicals before planting, up to an 80% decrease in infestation occurred. The use of nitrogen-rich fertilizers reduces the witchweed infection rate. Although the mechanism behind this is not fully understood, the abundance of nitrogen is thought to disrupt nitrogen reductase activity. This has a ripple effect, resulting in the dysregulation of the plant's light and dark cycle, resulting in the plants's death.

In 2018, an essential protein for witchweed germination was found to consistently bind to molecules of the detergent Triton X-100, which appears to inhibit the germination of the Striga seeds, preventing the natural strigolactones from binding to their usual substrate.

=== Intercropping ===
Intercropping with Desmodium spp. as in push-pull agriculture has been shown to be highly effective in the suppression of Striga. Allelochemicals released by roots of Desmodium lead to "suicidal germination" of Striga, thus reducing the seed bank in the soil. It has also been proposed that synthetic strigolactones could be used in agriculture to induce the suicidal germination of Striga seeds.

== Impact ==
In the late 1990s, "21 million hectares of cereals in Africa were estimated to be infested by S. hermonthica, leading to an estimated annual grain loss of 4.1 million tons".
