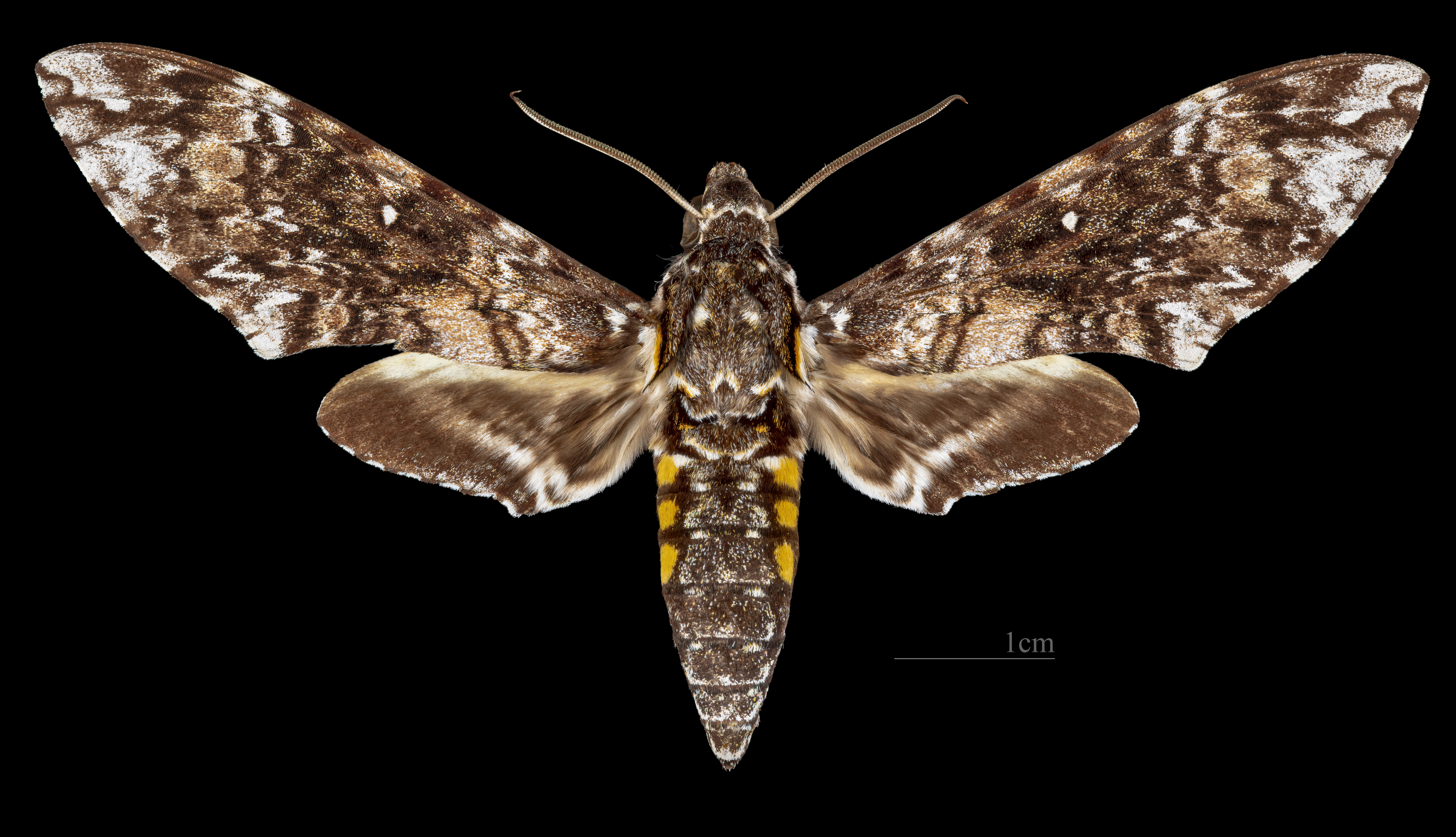
- Male dorsal
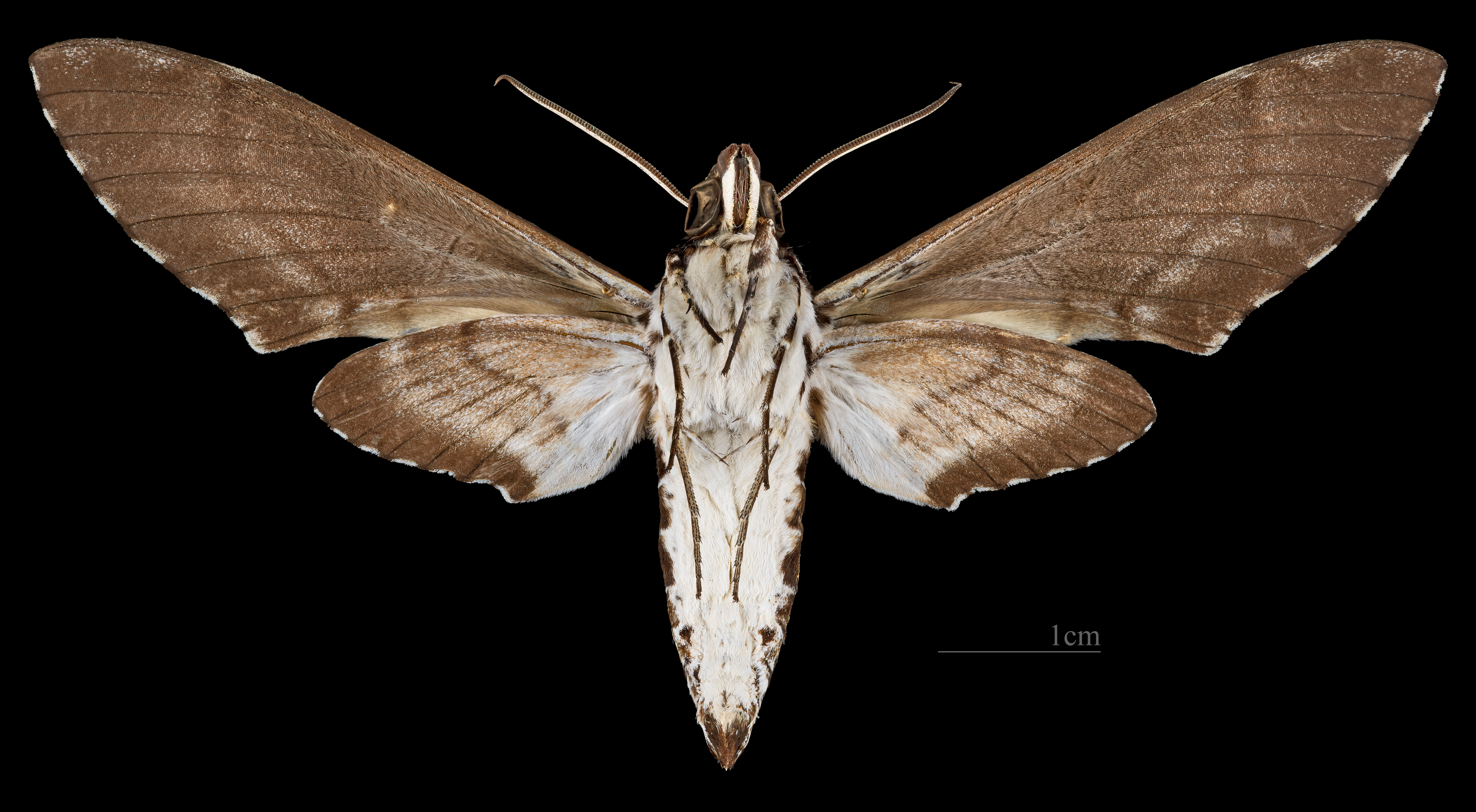
- Male ventral

Scientific classification
- Kingdom: Animalia
- Phylum: Arthropoda
- Class: Insecta
- Order: Lepidoptera
- Family: Sphingidae
- Genus: Manduca
- Species: M. leucospila

Binomial name
- Manduca leucospila (Rothschild & Jordan, 1903)

Synonyms
- Protoparce leucospila Rothschild & Jordan, 1903

= Manduca leucospila =

Species of moth

Manduca leucospila is a moth of the family Sphingidae.

== Distribution ==
It is known from Peru, Venezuela and Bolivia.

== Description ==
The length of the forewings is about 47 mm. It is similar in appearance to several other members of the genus Manduca, but a number of differences distinguish it from Manduca dalica, to which it most closely compares, particularly in its narrower wings and general colour which is intermediate between Manduca dalica and Manduca rustica. Furthermore, the abdomen upperside is similar to that of Manduca rustica, both having three yellow side patches, two rows of white dots and a mesial row of indistinct black dots. The underside of the body has a chalky colour.

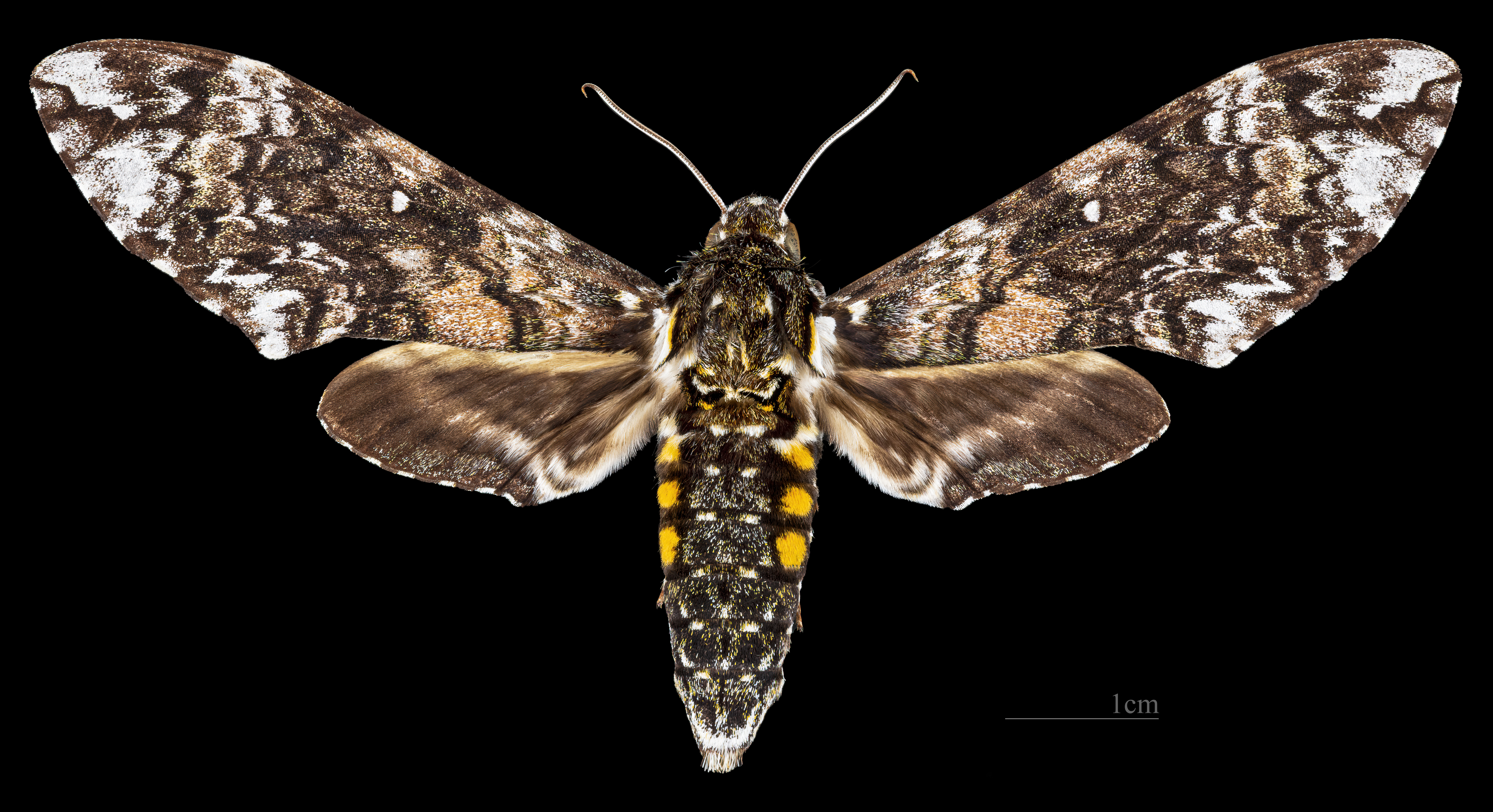
Manduca leucospila ♀

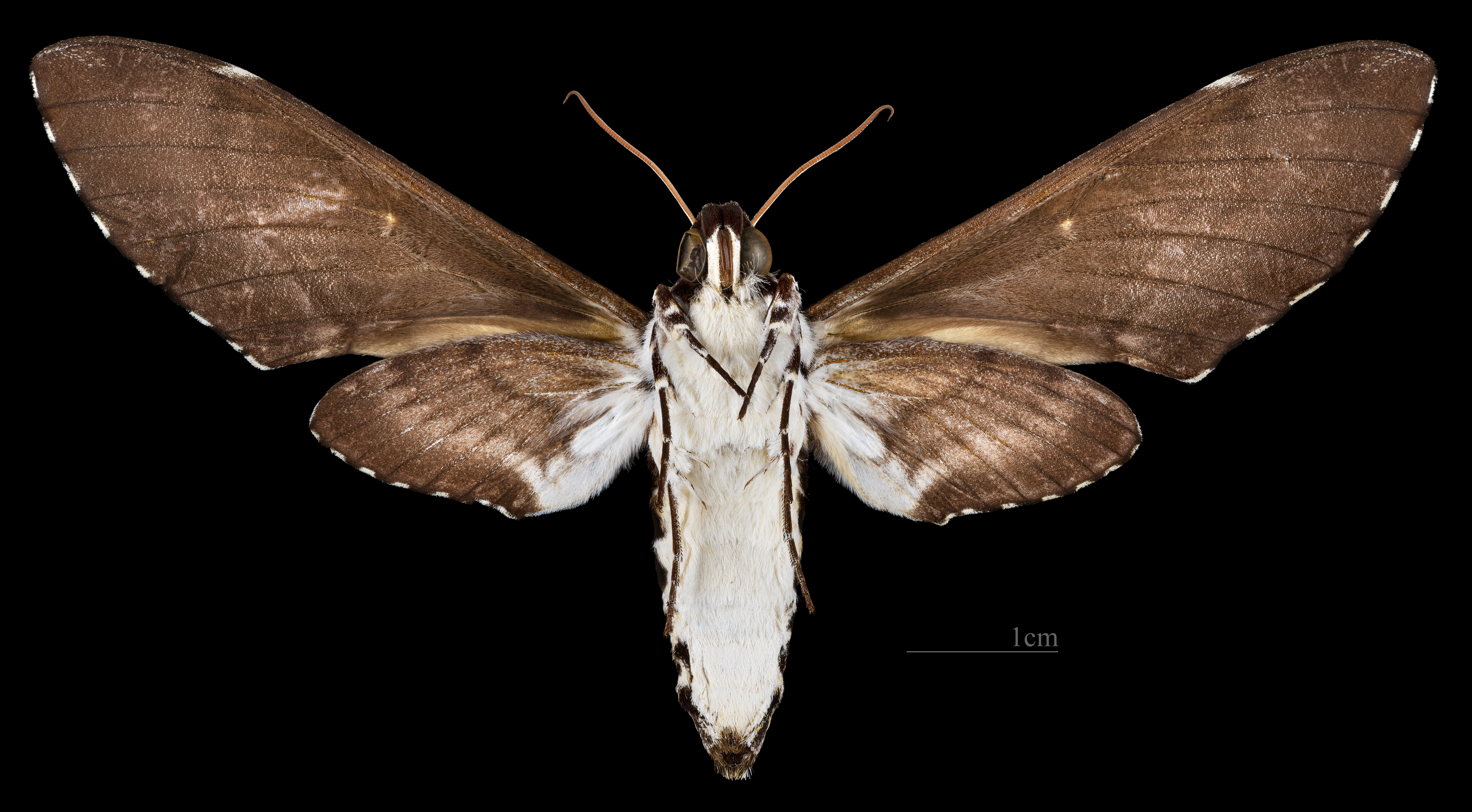
Manduca leucospila ♀ △
