= Aloysia dodsoniorum =

Conservation status
- Endangered (IUCN 3.1)

Scientific classification
- Kingdom: Plantae
- Clade: Tracheophytes
- Clade: Angiosperms
- Clade: Eudicots
- Clade: Asterids
- Order: Lamiales
- Family: Verbenaceae
- Genus: Aloysia
- Species: A. dodsoniorum

Binomial name
- Aloysia dodsoniorum Moldenke

Species of flowering plant

Aloysia dodsoniorum is a putative species of flowering plant in the verbena family, Verbenaceae, that is endemic to Ecuador. Its natural habitat is tropical dry forests. Plants of the World Online considers it an unplaced taxon – "names that cannot be accepted, nor can they be put into synonymy."
