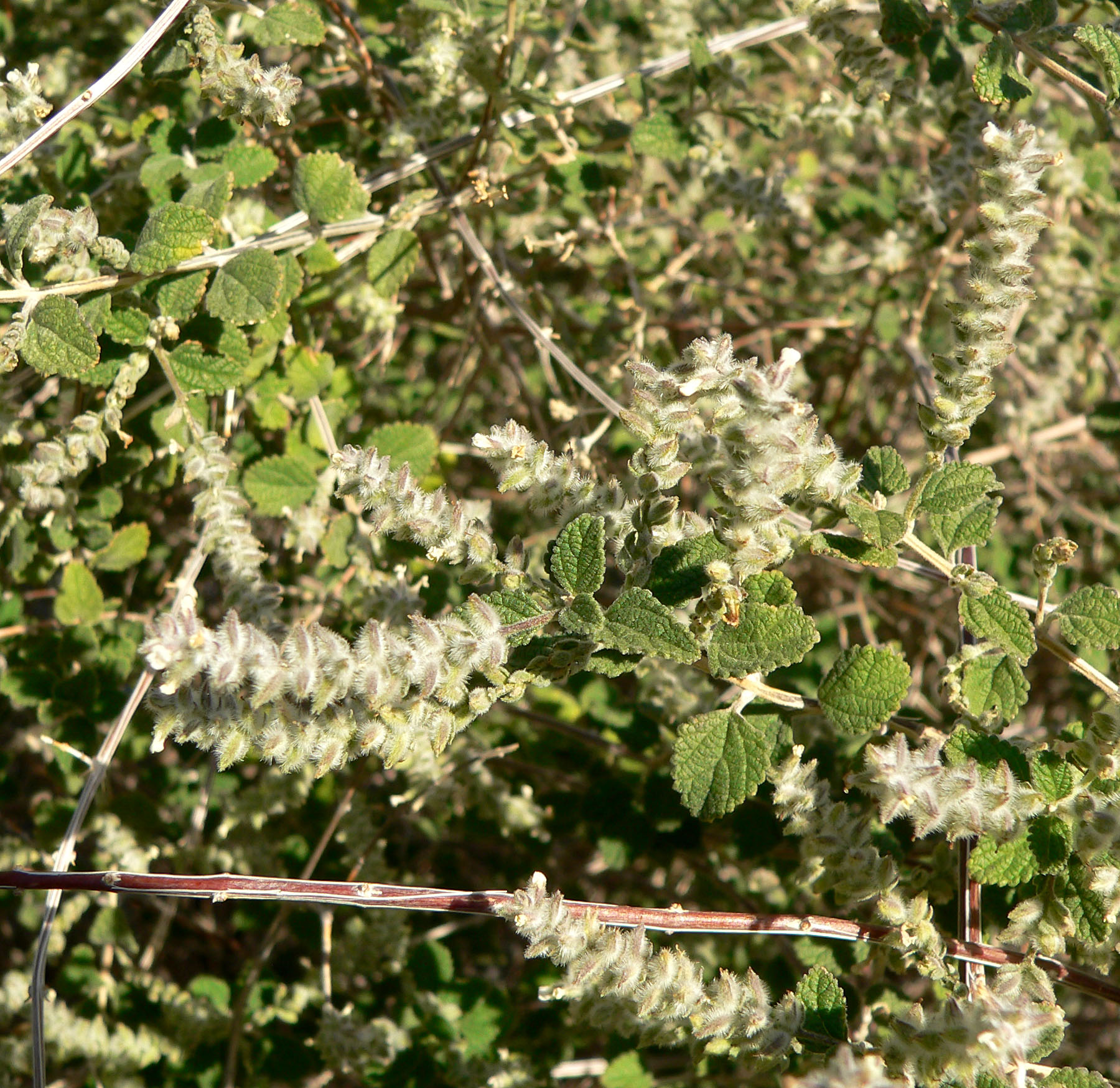

Scientific classification
- Kingdom: Plantae
- Clade: Tracheophytes
- Clade: Angiosperms
- Clade: Eudicots
- Clade: Asterids
- Order: Lamiales
- Family: Verbenaceae
- Genus: Aloysia
- Species: A. wrightii

Binomial name
- Aloysia wrightii (A.Gray) A.Heller

Synonyms
- Lippia wrightii

= Aloysia wrightii =

Species of flowering plant

Aloysia wrightii is a species of flowering plant in the verbena family known by the common names Wright's beebrush and oreganillo. It is native to the Sonoran Desert of southwestern United States and northern Mexico, where it can be found in moist desert canyons, scrub, and woodland habitat. This is a thickly branching shrub which reaches nearly two meters in maximum height and is generally rounded in form. It has small, oval-shaped to nearly round leaves each no more than two centimeters long. The leaves have lightly toothed edges and hairy undersides. The inflorescence is a narrow, woolly spike up to 6 centimeters long, with small, widely spaced white flowers. It is a valuable nectar source for native solitary bees. It is also larval and adult food plant for the rustic sphinx moth (Manduca rustica).
