= Aloysia fiebrigii =

Scientific classification
- Kingdom: Plantae
- Clade: Tracheophytes
- Clade: Angiosperms
- Clade: Eudicots
- Clade: Asterids
- Order: Lamiales
- Family: Verbenaceae
- Genus: Aloysia
- Species: A. fiebrigii

Binomial name
- Aloysia fiebrigii (Hayek) Moldenke

Synonyms
- Aloysia arcuifolia G.L.Nesom; Aloysia herrerae Moldenke; Lippia fiebrigii Hayek

Species of flowering plant

Aloysia fiebrigii is a species in the genus Aloysia in the family Verbenaceae. It is native to high elevation in the Andes of Bolivia.

Aloysia fiebrigii is distinguished by whorled, arcuate leaves, short spikes (7–17 mm long), short calyces 1.2-1.6 mm long, and bractlets approximately the same length as the calyx. The calyces are densely glandular and minutely strigose.
