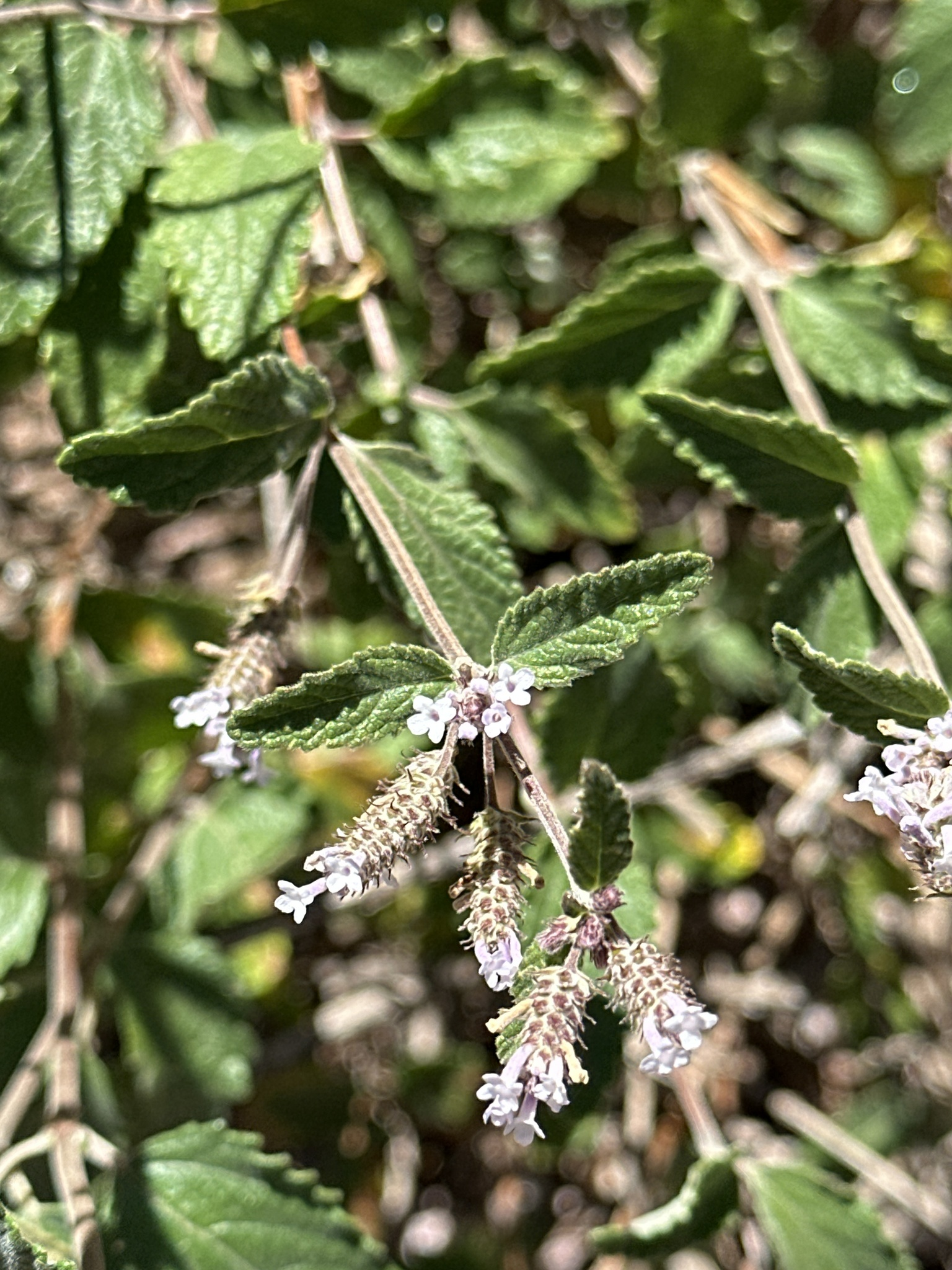

Scientific classification
- Kingdom: Plantae
- Clade: Tracheophytes
- Clade: Angiosperms
- Clade: Eudicots
- Clade: Asterids
- Order: Lamiales
- Family: Verbenaceae
- Genus: Aloysia
- Species: A. catamarcensis

Binomial name
- Aloysia catamarcensis Moldenke

= Aloysia catamarcensis =

Species of flowering plant

Aloysia catamarcensis is a species of flowering plant in the family Verbenaceae, native to north-western Argentina.
