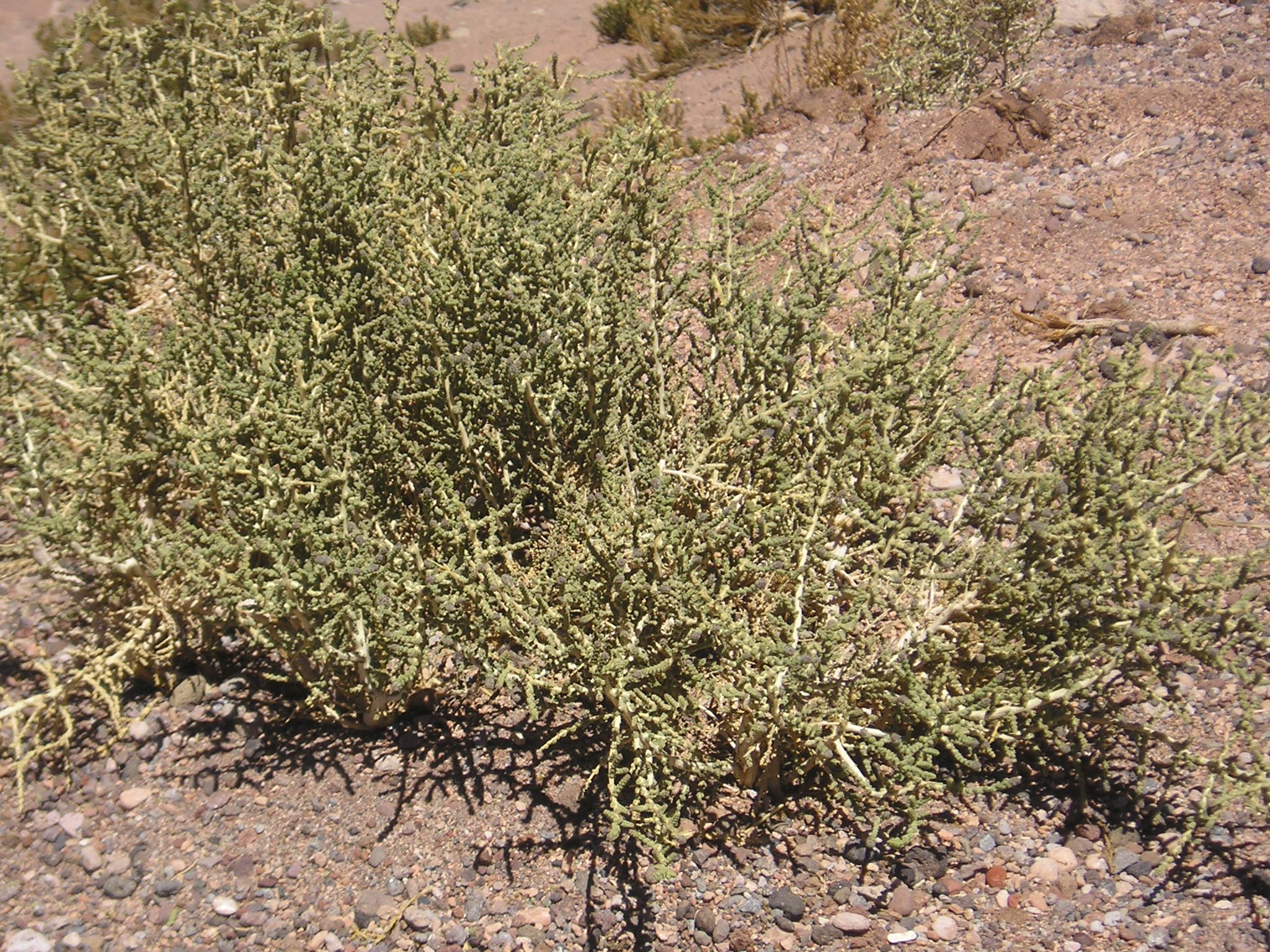
- A specimen near Socaire, to the south of San Pedro de Atacama, Chile.

Scientific classification
- Kingdom: Plantae
- Clade: Tracheophytes
- Clade: Angiosperms
- Clade: Eudicots
- Clade: Asterids
- Order: Lamiales
- Family: Verbenaceae
- Genus: Aloysia
- Species: A. deserticola

Binomial name
- Aloysia deserticola (Phil.) Lu-Irving & N.O'Leary

Synonyms
- Acantholippia deserticola (Phil.) Moldenke; Acantholippia punenis Botta; Lippia deserticola Phil.; Lippia microphylla Phil.; Lippia trifida Phil.

= Aloysia deserticola =

Species of shrub

Aloysia deserticola, also known as rica-rica or kore, is an aromatic shrub that is endemic to the Andean Altiplano, concentrated in the Chilean regions of Arica y Parinacota, Tarapacá, and Antofagasta.

== Description ==
Aloysia deserticola is a branched shrub of 0.4–1.0 metre (1.3–3.3 ft), with cylindrical branches. It has yellow-green opposing leaves, with a "brain-like" appearance, that measure approximately 1.5 millimetres (0.059 in) long and 1.5–2 millimetres (0.059–0.079 in) wide. The leaves are trilobed, more or less rhomboidal in outline, with bumps on the abaxial side and a notable groove on each lobe. The epidermis has a thick cuticle that becomes thinner toward the top of the groove. The adaxial side has thick, whitish trichomes on the upper half and is hairy on the lower half. It has spiciform, terminal, and sessile racemes that are globose to cylindrical, measuring 12–15 millimetres (0.47–0.59 in) in length. It grows lilac flowers, 3–3.5 millimetres (0.12–0.14 in) in length.

== Uses ==
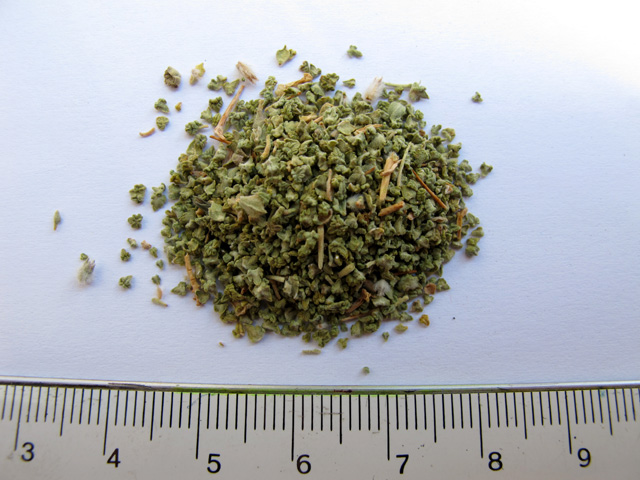
Rica-rica sold at a market in Argentina's Salta Province

In Northern Chilean cuisine, rica-rica is frequently used as an aromatic herb. It is used as a condiment, spice, and in the preparation of herbal infusions. Its leaves and branches are also dried and used to season food, as flavorings for mate and tea, as part of the drink known as a "rica-rica sour," and for making artisanal ice cream.

In traditional medicine in communities such as San Pedro de Atacama, Toconce, Socaire, and Ollagüe, rica-rica is used to treat indigestion, as an antispasmodic that targets the symptoms of stomach problems. An infusion of its leaves is also used to treat circulatory and kidney problems.

== Taxonomy ==
The species was initially described as Lippia deserticola by Rodolfo Amando Philippi and published in the Anales de la Universidad de Chile 2: 350, in 1865, and today this name is both a synonym and basionym. Later, it was transferred to the genus Acantholippia by Harold Norman Moldenke in Lilloa 5: 370, in 1940, a scientific name that also remains a synonym today. Finally, in 2014, it was transferred to the genus Aloysia by Patricia Lu-Irving and Nataly O'Leary in Systematic Botany 39(2): 653.

=== Etymology ===
See: Aloysia

deserticola: Latin epithet that means "desert-dwelling"
