= Aloysia herrerae =

Scientific classification
- Kingdom: Plantae
- Clade: Tracheophytes
- Clade: Angiosperms
- Clade: Eudicots
- Clade: Asterids
- Order: Lamiales
- Family: Verbenaceae
- Genus: Aloysia
- Species: A. herrerae

Binomial name
- Aloysia herrerae Moldenke

Species of plant

Aloysia herrerae, commonly known as cedroncillo, is a species of shrub in the family Verbenaceae, native to Peru and Bolivia. In its locality it was commonly used to treat various ailments in traditional folk medicine and it is also utilized to create essential oils.
