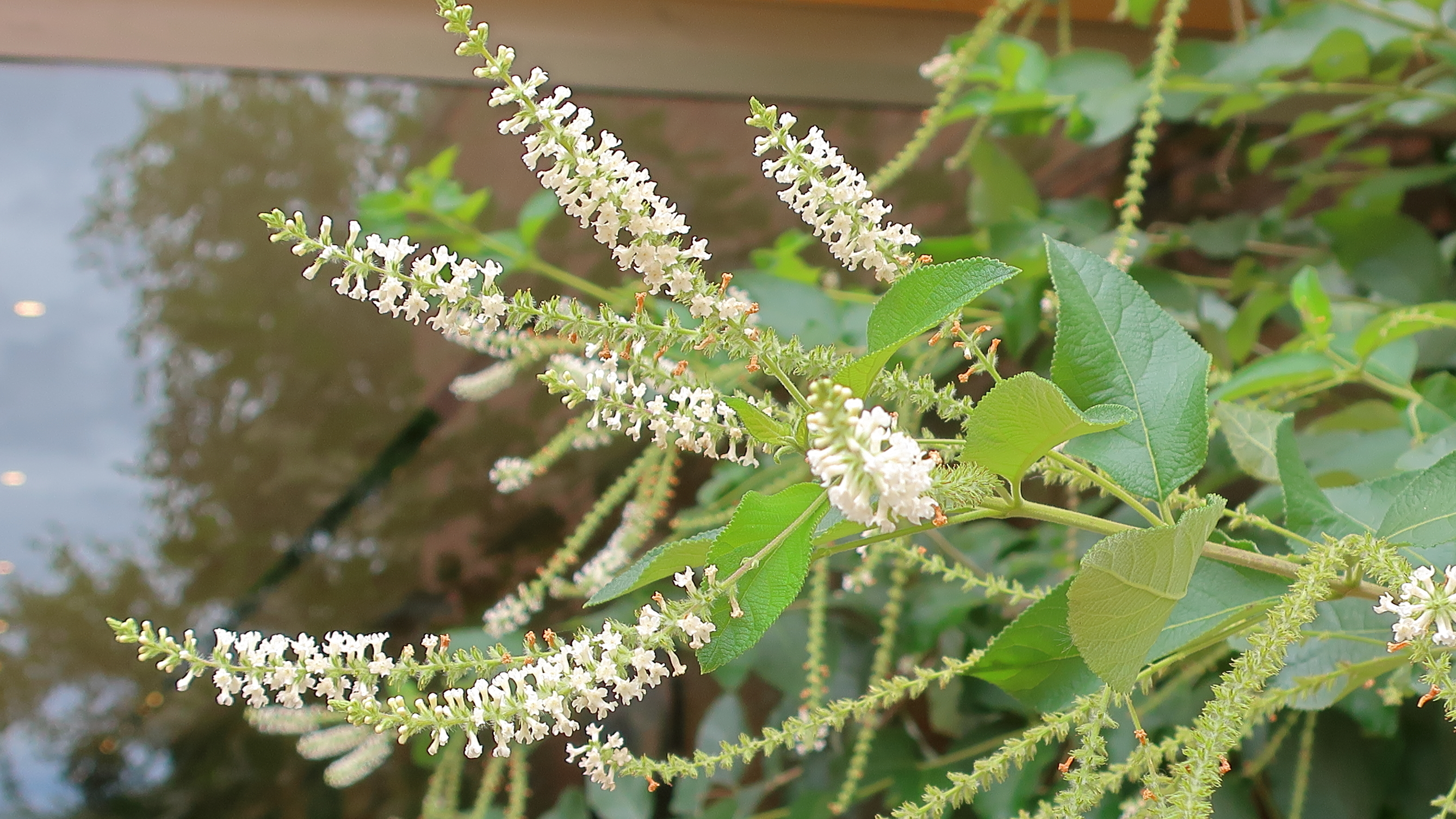

Conservation status
- Least Concern (IUCN 3.1)

Scientific classification
- Kingdom: Plantae
- Clade: Tracheophytes
- Clade: Angiosperms
- Clade: Eudicots
- Clade: Asterids
- Order: Lamiales
- Family: Verbenaceae
- Genus: Aloysia
- Species: A. virgata

Binomial name
- Aloysia virgata (Ruiz & Pav.) Juss.

Synonyms
- Lippia virgata (Ruiz & Pav.) Kuntze; Priva virgata (Ruiz & Pav.) Spreng.; Verbena virgata Ruiz & Pav.

= Aloysia virgata =

Species of flowering plant

Aloysia virgata, known as sweet almond verbena and sweet almond bush, is a perennial plant in the family Verbenaceae native to Argentina. It grows from Central Argentina up to Brazil and Peru, with multiple instances in Yucatán, Southeastern United States, and Texas.

== Description ==
The large, shrubby bush has many small white flowers and grows up to around 8 to 15 feet tall, and about 8 feet wide.

== Name ==
The common names "sweet almond verbena" and "sweet almond bush" come from the fact that the plant smells of almonds.

== Cultivation ==
Aloysia virgata is popular for its sweet almond fragrance and for the fact that it attracts both butterflies and hummingbirds. It was elected one of the 2008 Florida Plants of the Year by the Florida Nursery Growers and Landscapers Association. It can be grown in USDA zones 7 to 9. The plant can be propagated through vegetative reproduction and possibly by layering.
