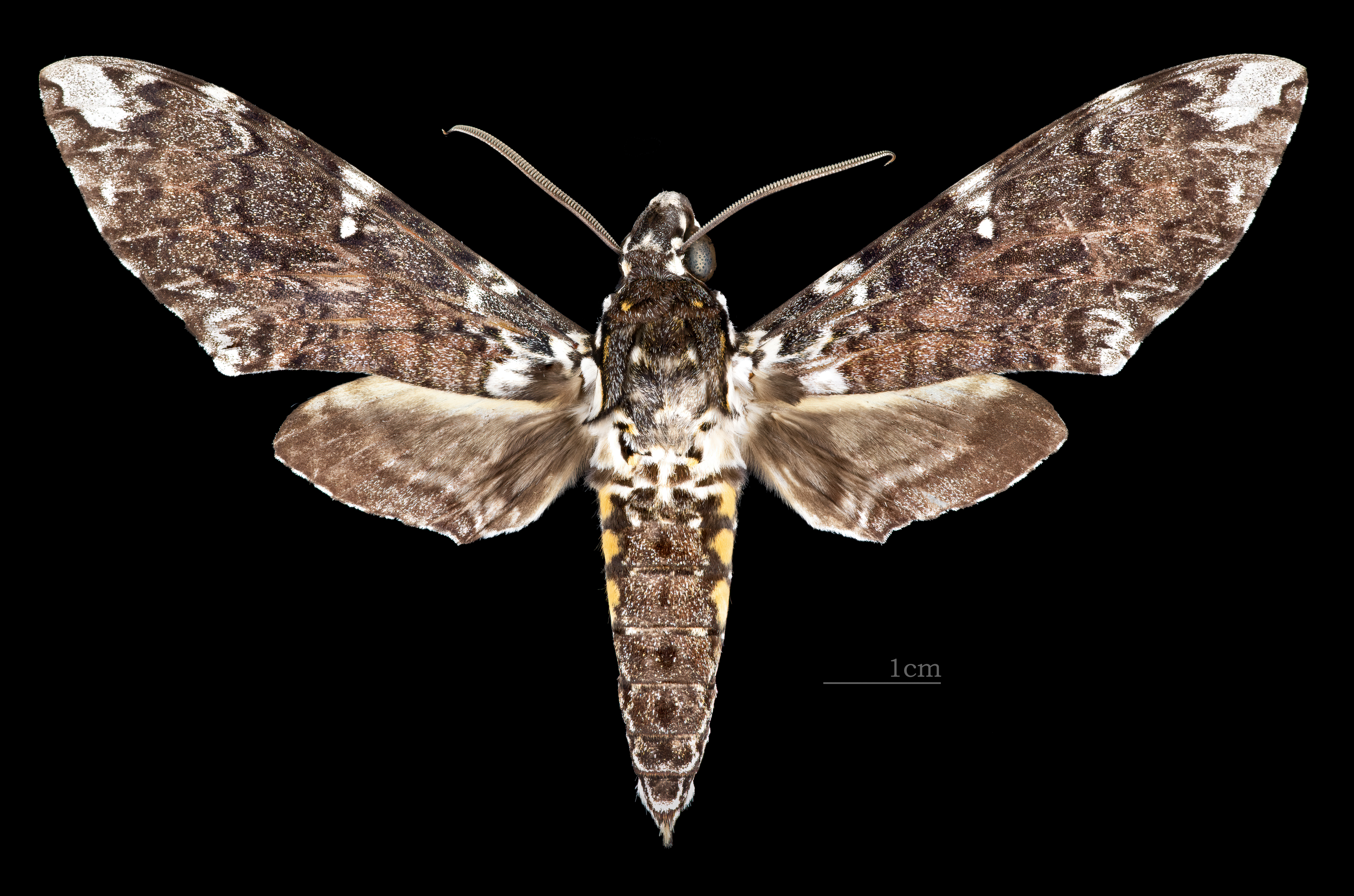
- Manduca dalica dalica, male dorsal
- Manduca dalica dalica, male ventral

Scientific classification
- Kingdom: Animalia
- Phylum: Arthropoda
- Class: Insecta
- Order: Lepidoptera
- Family: Sphingidae
- Genus: Manduca
- Species: M. dalica

Binomial name
- Manduca dalica (Kirby, 1877)

Synonyms
- Protoparce dalica Kirby, 1877; Phlegethontius garleppi Rothschild, 1895; Protoparce dalica anthina Jordan, 1911

= Manduca dalica =

Species of moth

Manduca dalica is a moth of the family Sphingidae.

== Distribution ==
It is known from Brazil, Peru, Bolivia, Venezuela and Costa Rica.

== Description ==
The wingspan is 120–135 mm. The upperside is generally dark, with mottled white forewing bases, connected by a similar pattern across the posterior part of the thorax. There is a large, prominent, white discal spot and a whitish apical mark.

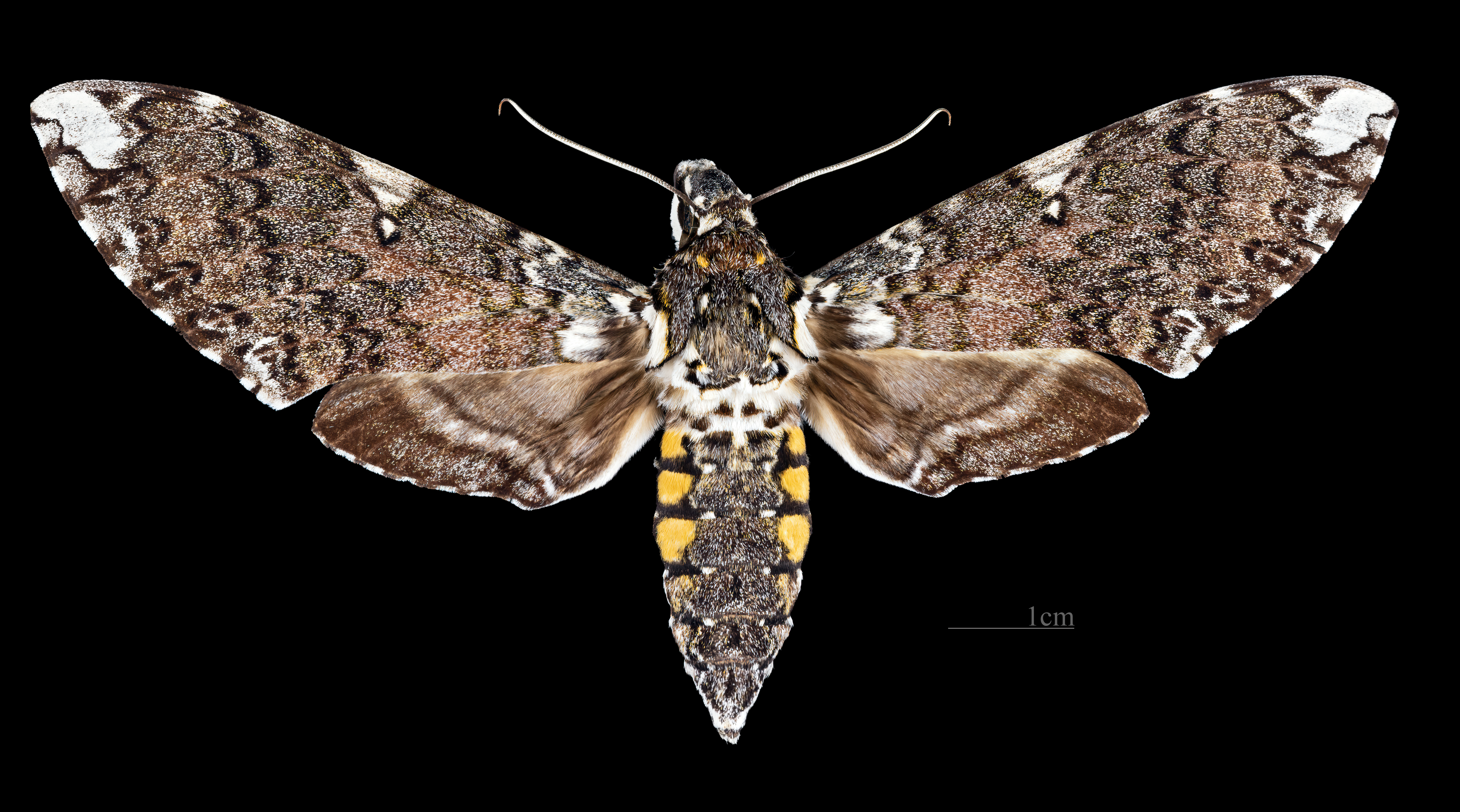
Manduca dalica ♀

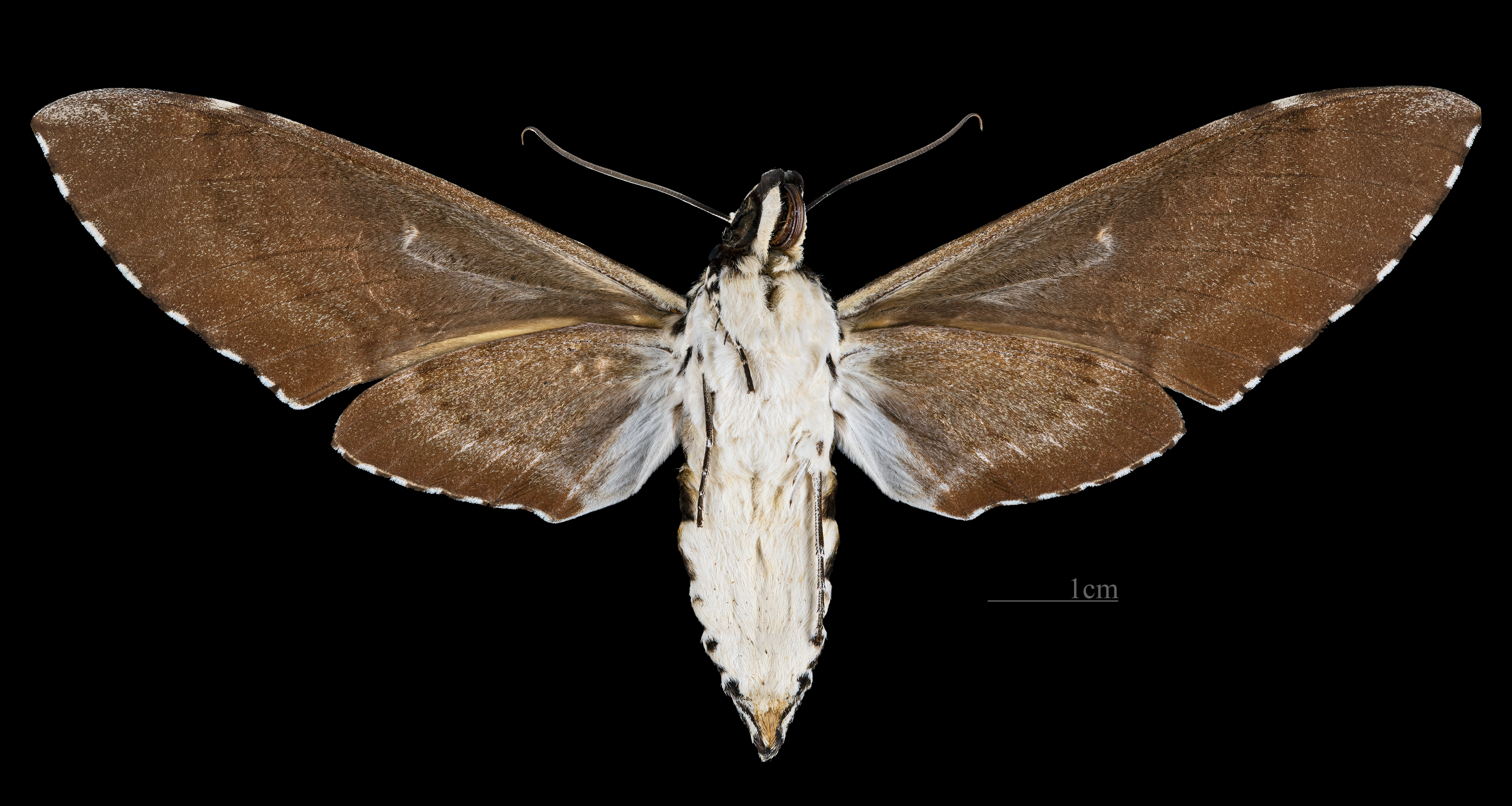
Manduca dalica ♀ △

== Biology ==
Adults have been recorded in February and from April to October in Costa Rica and in November in Brazil. There are probably three generations per year.

== Subspecies ==
- Manduca dalica dalica (Peru, Bolivia, Venezuela and Costa Rica)
- Manduca dalica anthina (Jordan, 1911) (south-eastern Brazil)
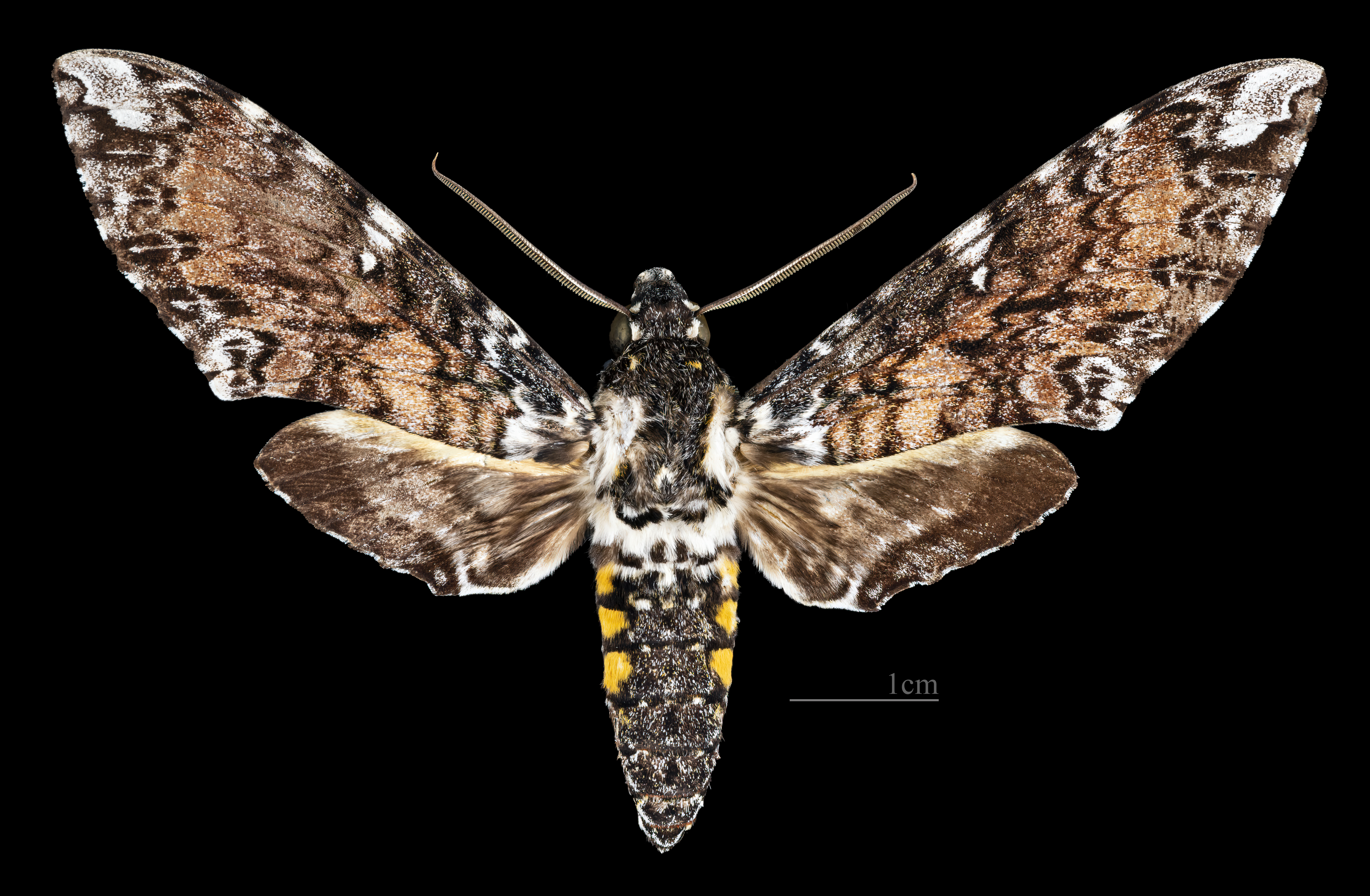
Manduca dalica anthina ♂

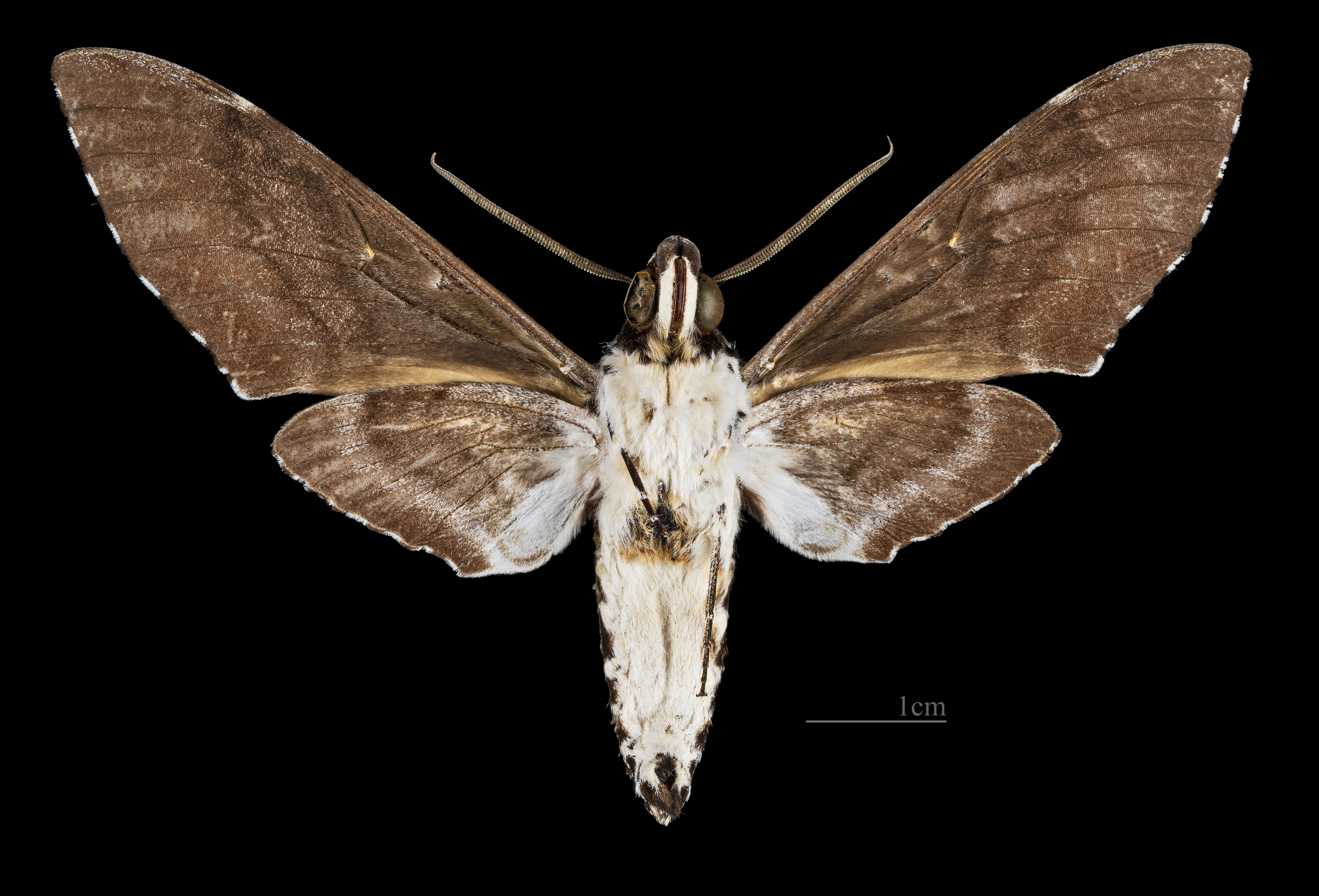
Manduca dalica anthina ♂ △

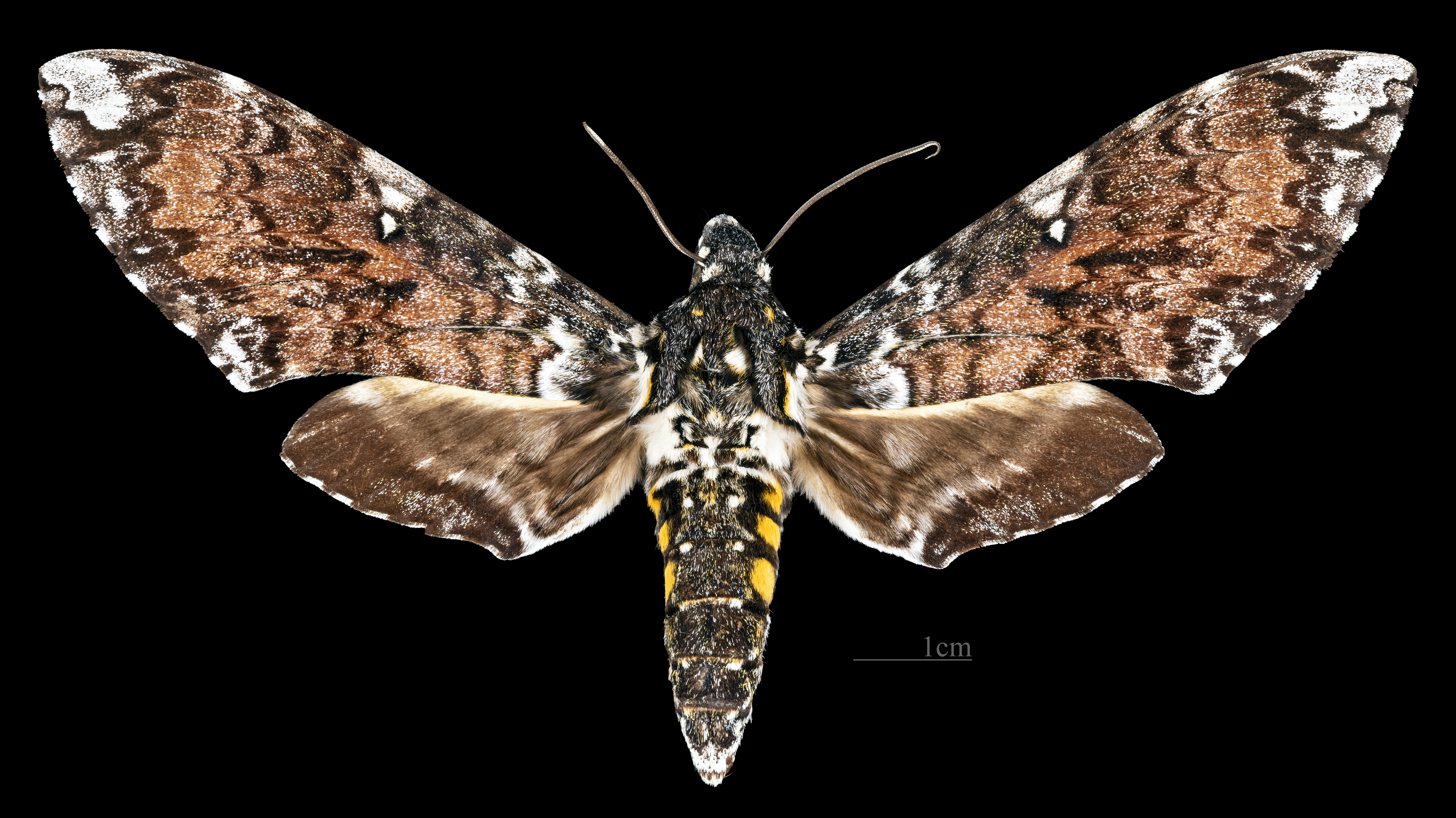
Manduca dalica anthina ♀

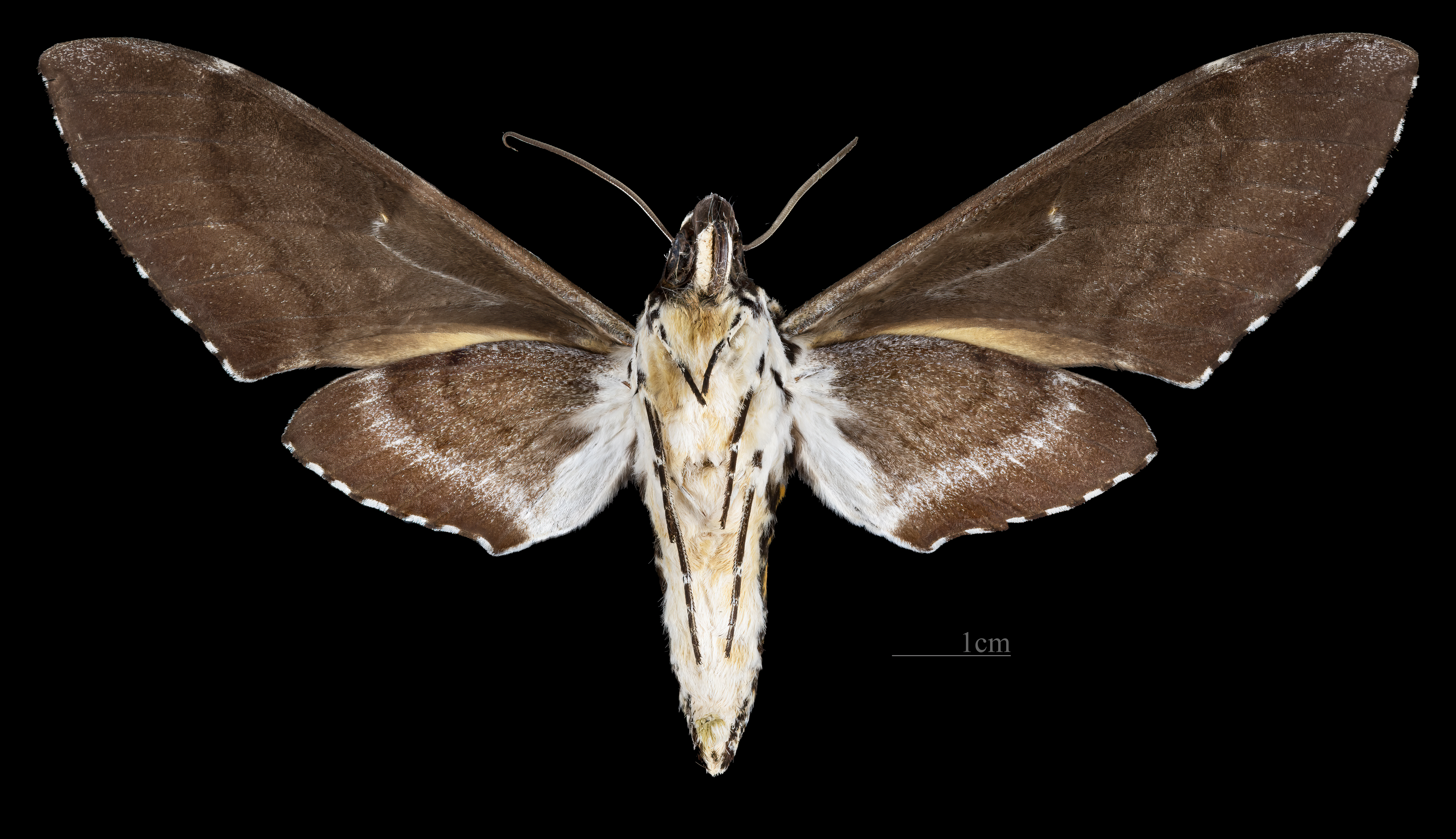
Manduca dalica anthina ♀ △
