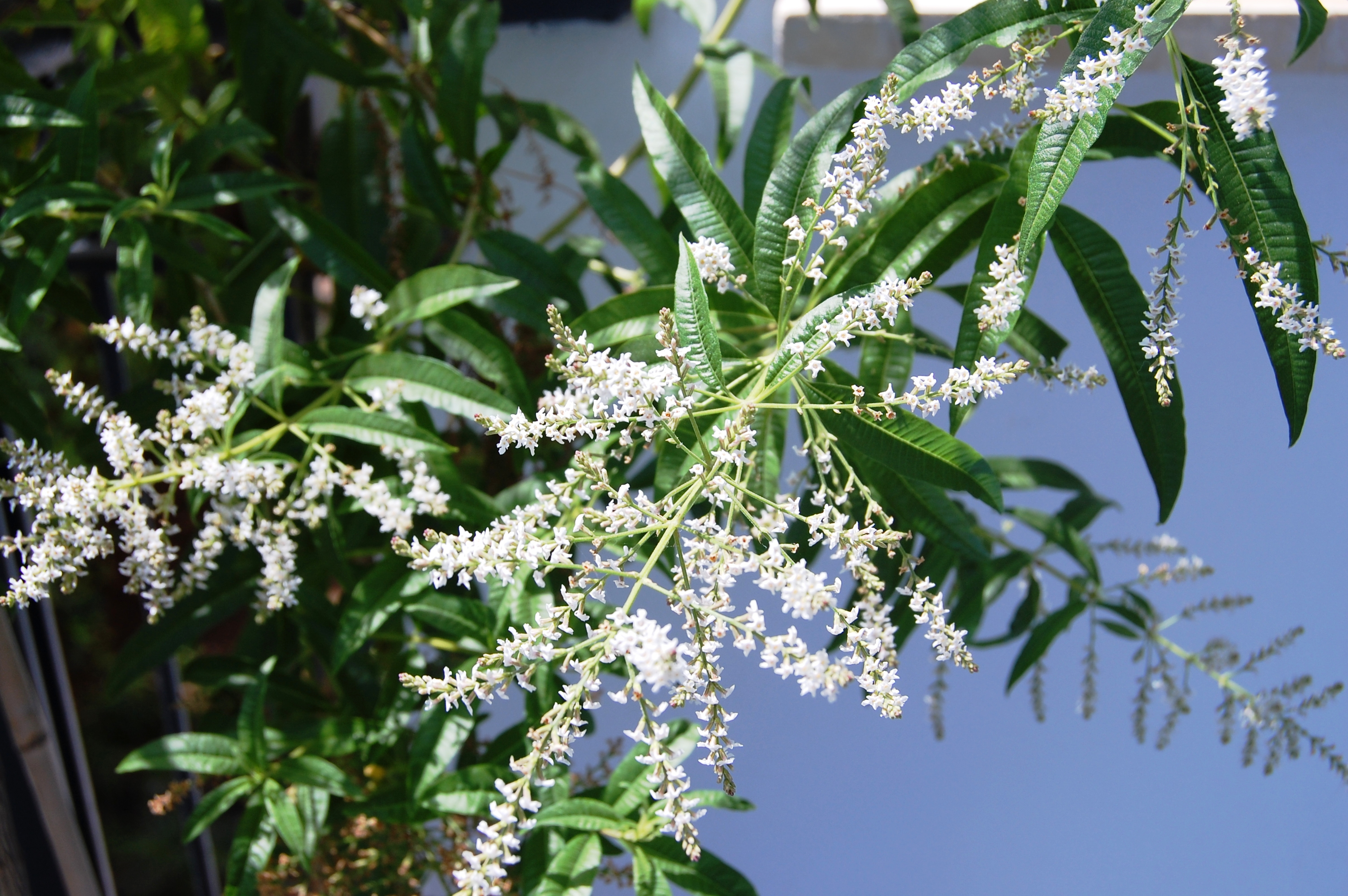
- lemon verbena (Aloysia citrodora)

Scientific classification
- Kingdom: Plantae
- Clade: Embryophytes
- Clade: Tracheophytes
- Clade: Spermatophytes
- Clade: Angiosperms
- Clade: Eudicots
- Clade: Asterids
- Order: Lamiales
- Family: Verbenaceae
- Genus: Aloysia; Paláu

Species
- about 40, see text

Synonyms
- Acantholippia Griseb.; Dadia Vell.; Xeroaloysia Tronc.

= Aloysia =

Genus of flowering plants in the vervain family Verbenaceae

Aloysia is a genus of flowering plants in the verbena family, Verbenaceae. They are known generally as beebrushes. They are native to the Americas, where they are distributed in temperate climates, as well as in subtropical and desert climates. The genus is named for the Spanish queen Maria Luisa of Parma (1751-1819).

== Description ==
These plants are subshrubs, shrubs, or trees growing 0.5 meters to 15 meters tall. Many are very aromatic. The stems may be four-angled and smooth when new, becoming more angular or rounded and often furrowed or striated with age. The leaves are evergreen or deciduous in the dry season. They are often oppositely arranged or whorled, but can be alternate or clustered. The blades are variable in shape, toothed or smooth-edged, and hairless to rough-haired on the upper surfaces. The undersides may have glandular hairs. The inflorescence is usually a raceme of widely spaced clusters of 3 to 6 flowers each. There are leaflike bracts under the flowers which can be showy in some species. The calyx of sepals has 2 or 4 lobes and is persistent, enclosing the fruit as it develops. The flower corolla is tubular with a wider mouth divided into four lobes, one of which may be cleft. The corolla can be white, purplish, blue, or pink. The narrow style is tipped with a bilobed stigma and there are 4 stamens. The fruit is a schizocarp.

== Species ==
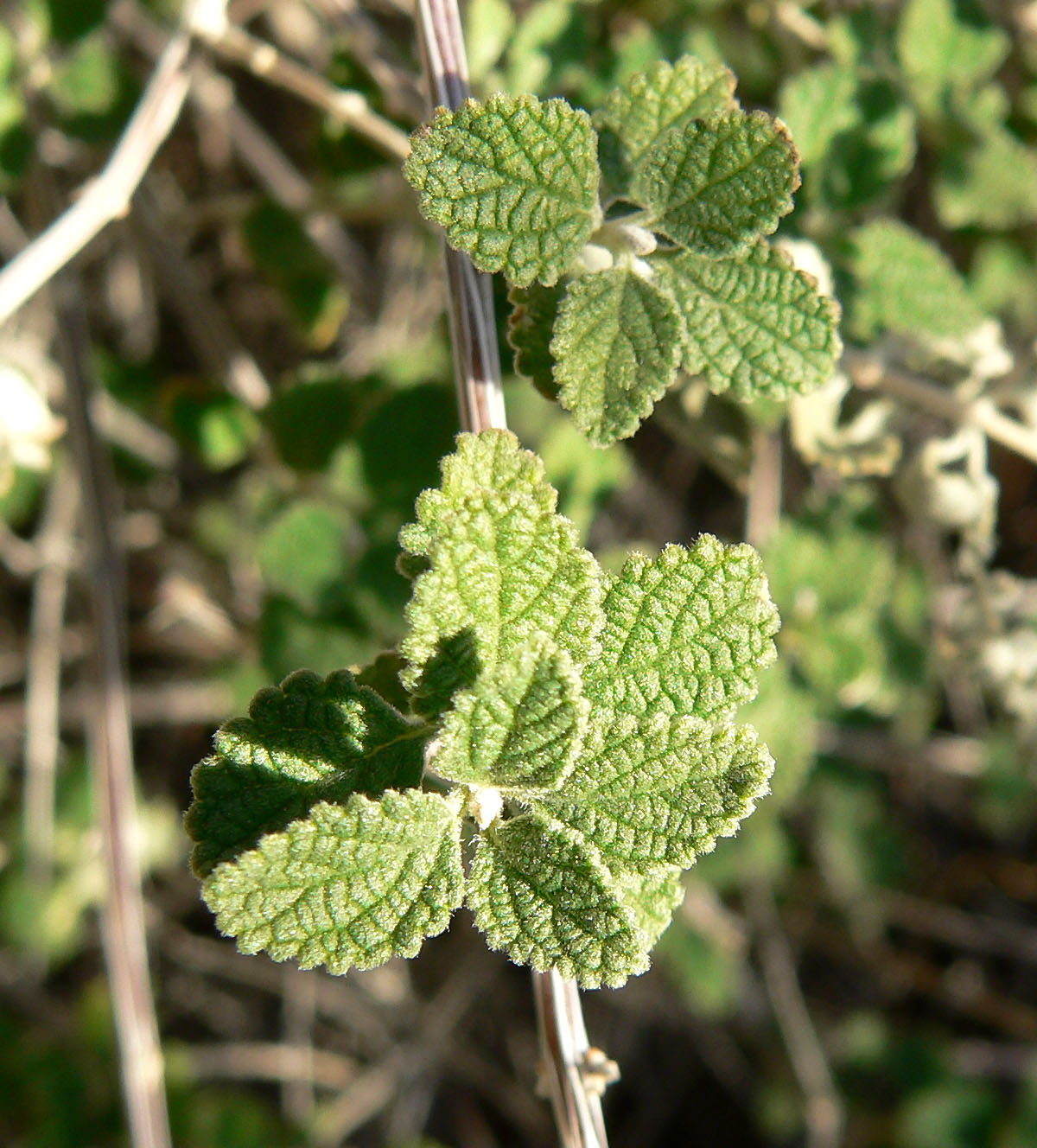
Aloysia wrightii

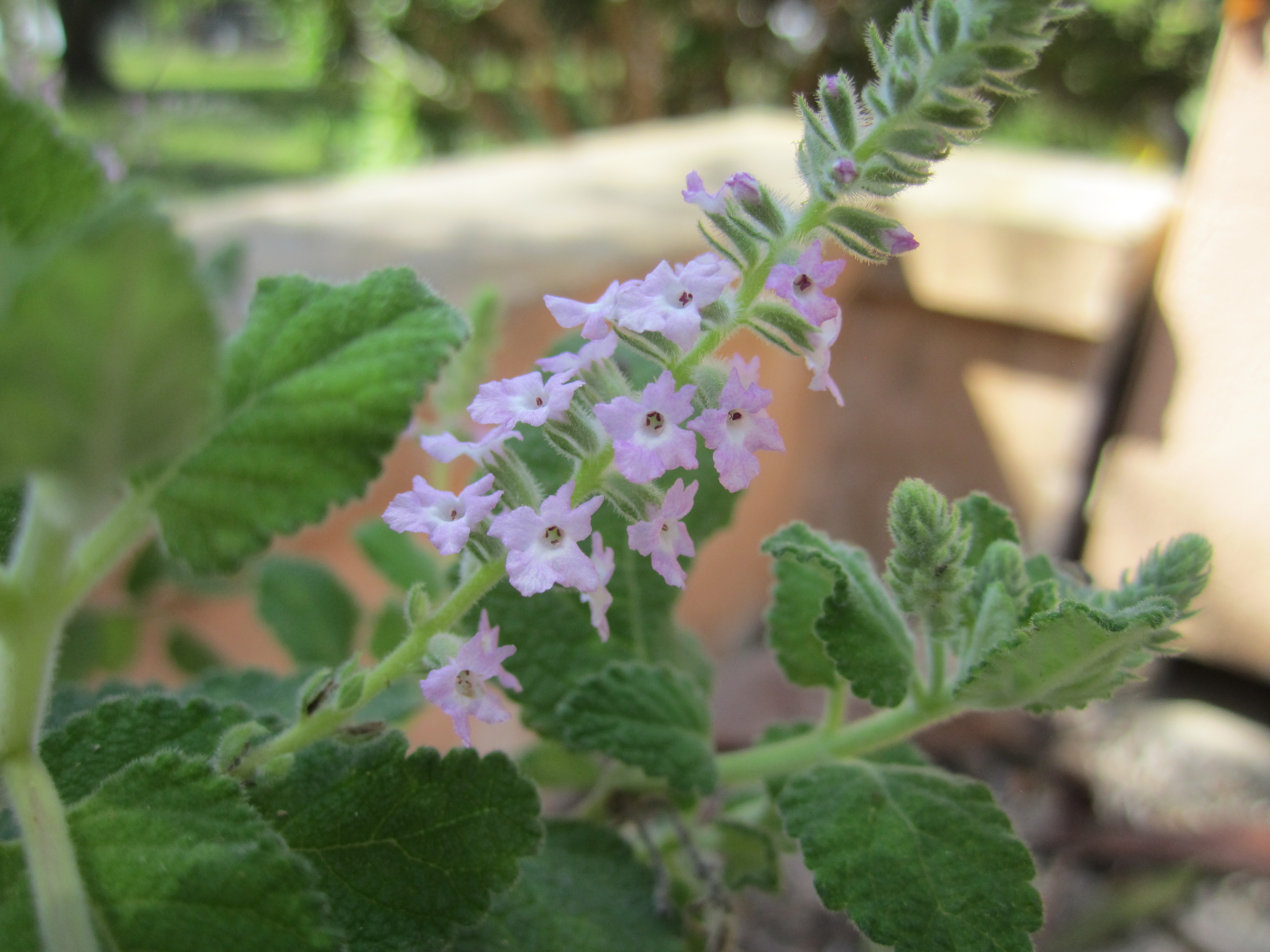
Aloysia macrostachya

The following 41 species are recognised in the genus Aloysia:

- Aloysia arequipensis Siedo
- Aloysia barbata (Brandegee) Moldenke
- Aloysia brasiliensis Moldenke
- Aloysia castellanosii Moldenke
- Aloysia catamarcensis Moldenke
- Aloysia chamaedryfolia Cham.
- Aloysia chiapensis Moldenke
- Aloysia citrodora Paláu – lemon verbena, lemon beebrush
- Aloysia coalcomana Siedo
- Aloysia cordata Siedo
- Aloysia crenata Moldenke
- Aloysia decipiens Ravenna
- Aloysia densispicata (K.Koch & C.D.Bouché) Moldenke
- Aloysia deserticola (Phil.) Lu-Irving & N.O'Leary
- Aloysia dusenii Moldenke
- Aloysia fiebrigii (Hayek) Moldenke
- Aloysia gentryi Moldenke
- Aloysia gratissima (Gillies & Hook.) Tronc. – common beebrush, whitebrush, whitebush
- Aloysia hatschbachii Moldenke
- Aloysia herrerae Moldenke
- Aloysia macrostachya (Torr.) Moldenke – Rio Grande beebrush
- Aloysia nahuire Gentry & Moldenke
- Aloysia oblanceolata Moldenke
- Aloysia ovatifolia Moldenke
- Aloysia peruviana (Turcz.) Moldenke
- Aloysia polygalifolia Cham.
- Aloysia polystachya (Grisebach) Moldenke – burro, burrito
- Aloysia pulchra (Briq.) Moldenke
- Aloysia riojana (Hieron. ex Moldenke) Lu-Irving & N.O'Leary
- Aloysia salsoloides (Griseb.) Lu-Irving & N.O'Leary
- Aloysia salviifolia (Hook. & Arn.) Moldenke
- Aloysia schulziana Moldenke
- Aloysia scorodonioides (Kunth) Cham.
- Aloysia sonorensis Moldenke
- Aloysia spathulata (Hayek) Moldenke
- Aloysia tarapacana (Botta) Lu-Irving & N.O'Leary
- Aloysia trifida (Gay) Lu-Irving & N.O'Leary
- Aloysia unifacialis Ravenna
- Aloysia velutina Siedo
- Aloysia virgata (Ruiz & Pav.) Juss.
- Aloysia wrightii A.Heller – mintbush lippia, Wright's beebrush

=== Formerly placed here ===
- Mulguraea ligustrina (as A. ligustrina (Lag.) Small)
