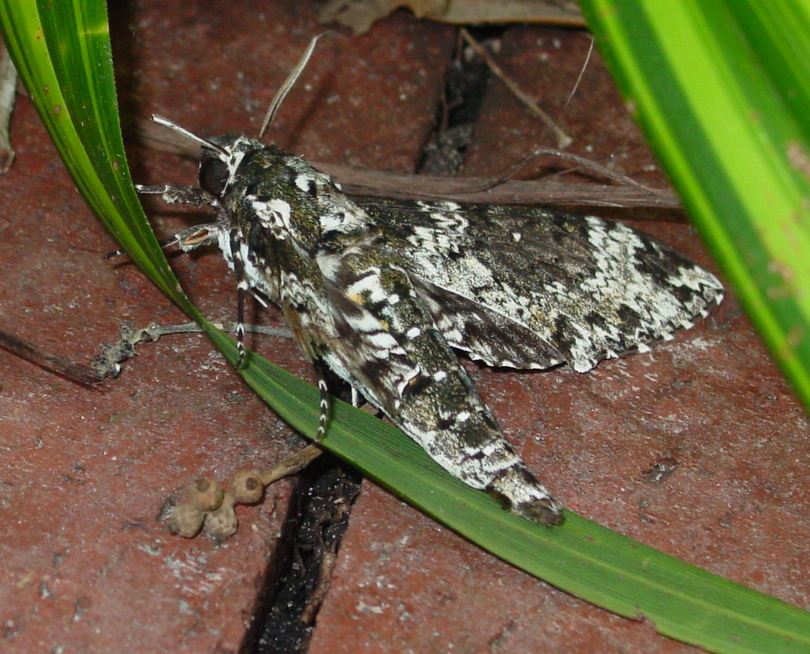

Conservation status
- Secure (NatureServe)

Scientific classification
- Kingdom: Animalia
- Phylum: Arthropoda
- Class: Insecta
- Order: Lepidoptera
- Family: Sphingidae
- Genus: Manduca
- Species: M. rustica

Binomial name
- Manduca rustica (Fabricius, 1775)

Synonyms
- Sphinx rustica Fabricius, 1775; Sphinx chionanthi J. E. Smith, 1797; Protoparce nigrita Clark, 1926; Protoparce postscripta Clark, 1926; Protoparce rustica auriflua Gehlen, 1930; Phlegethontius rustica harterti Rothschild, 1894; Protoparce rustica calapagensis Holland, 1889; Phlegethontius rustica cortesi Cary, 1963; Protoparce rustica cubana Wood, 1915; Protoparce rustica dominicana Gehlen, 1928

= Manduca rustica =

Rustic sphinx

Species of moth

Manduca rustica, the rustic sphinx, is a moth of the family Sphingidae. The species was first described by Johan Christian Fabricius in 1775.

== Distribution ==
It is found in the southern parts of the United States (straying into the northern United States at times), southward through Mexico, Central America and South America to Uruguay.

== Description ==
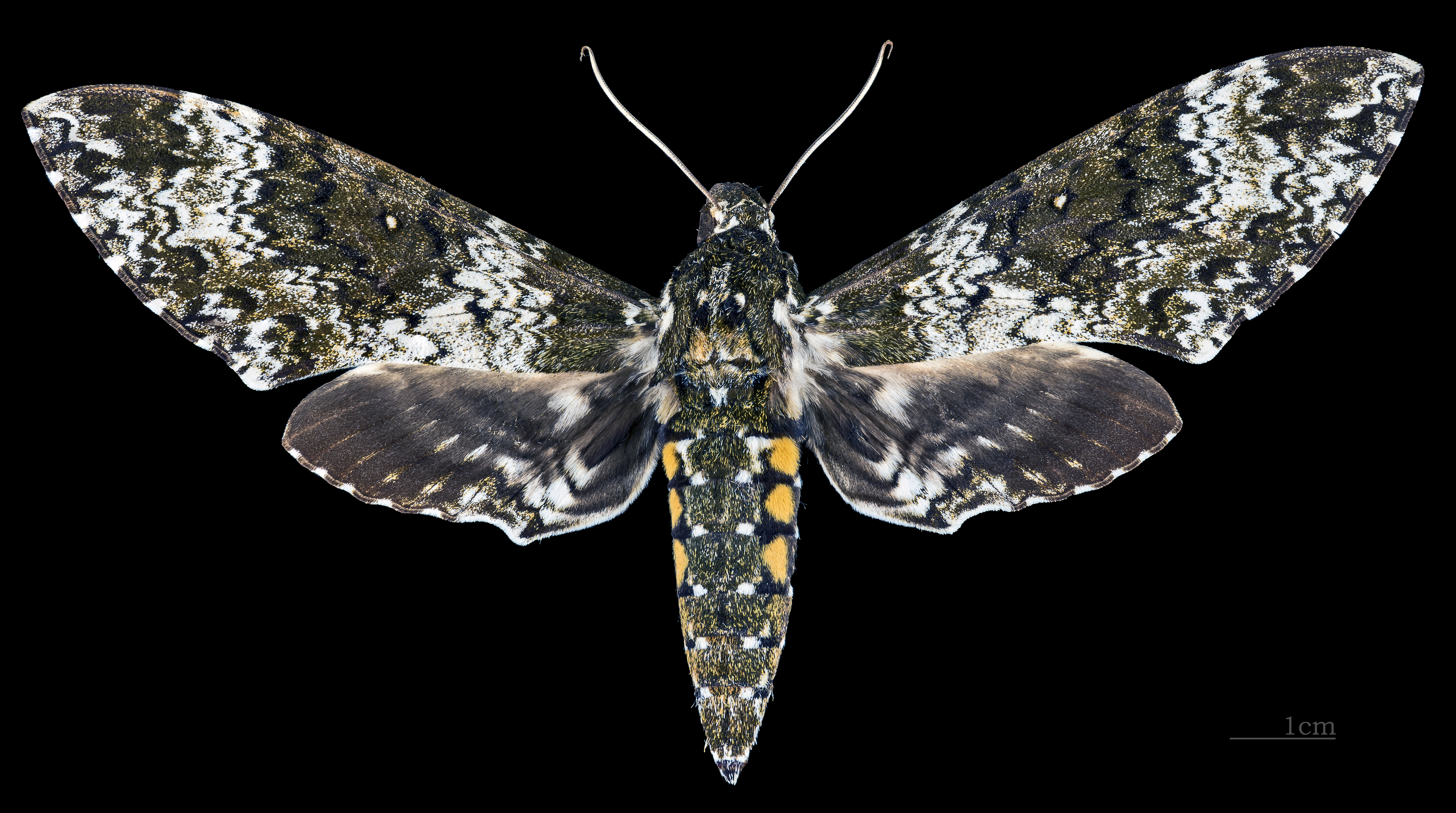
Male Manduca rustica rustica, dorsal view

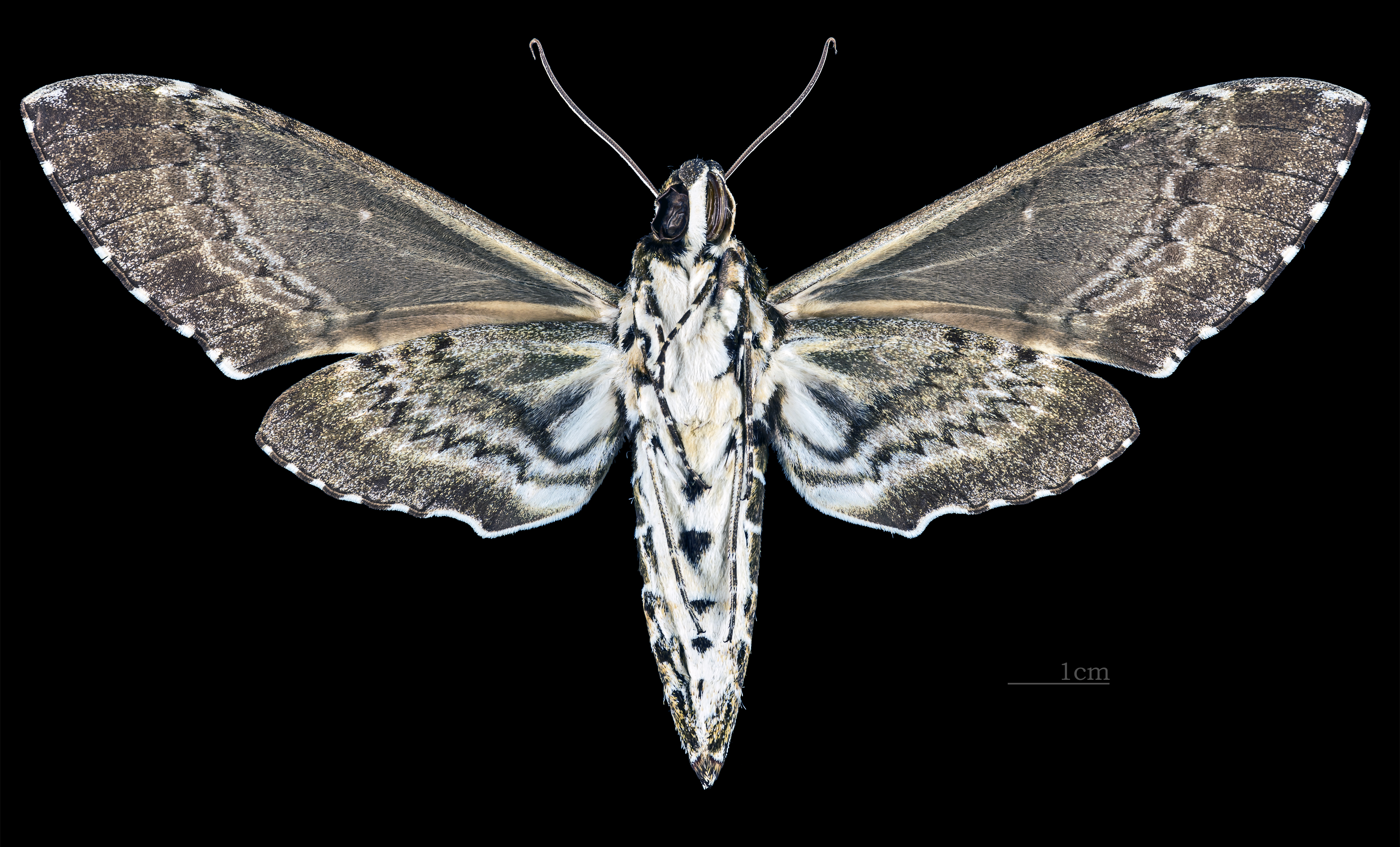
Male Manduca rustica rustica, ventral view

== Biology ==
The larvae feed on a variety of plants including Jasminum, Bignonia and Chilopsis. Larvae have been recorded on plants from a variety of families, including Bignoniaceae, Oleaceae, Verbenaceae, Convolvulaceae and Lamiaceae.

The species is widespread and adaptable, living in varied habitats from rainforests to deserts and thriving in urban and disturbed habitat. It can live on many types of native and exotic plants.

== Subspecies ==
- Manduca rustica cortesi (Cary, 1963) (Mexico)
- Manduca rustica cubana (Wood, 1915) (Cuba, Jamaica)
- Manduca rustica calapagensis (Holland, 1889) (Galápagos Islands)
- Manduca rustica harterti (Rothschild, 1894) (Lesser Antilles, including Bonaire and St. Lucia)
- Manduca rustica rustica (Americas)
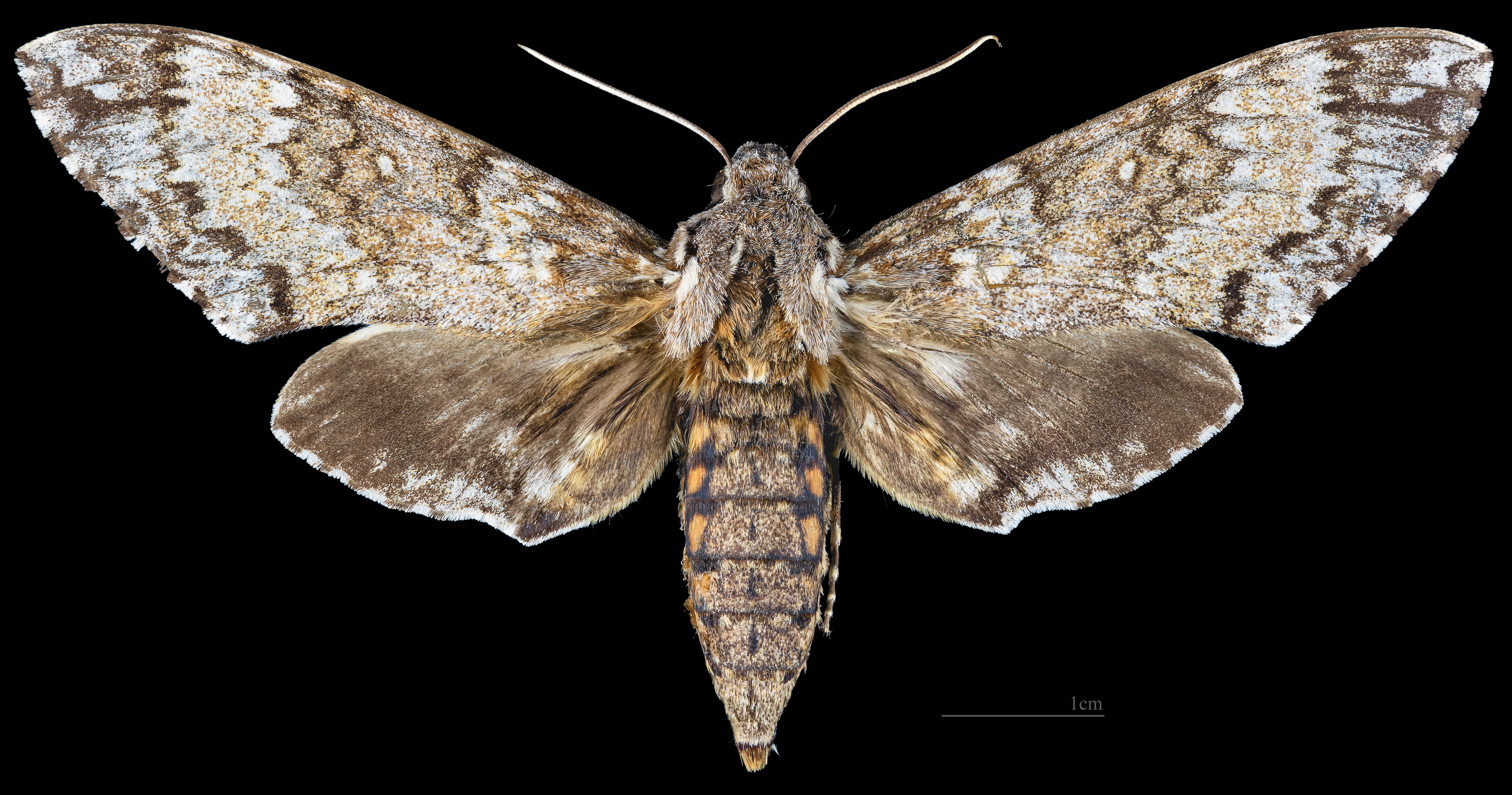
Manduca rustica calapagensis, female, dorsal

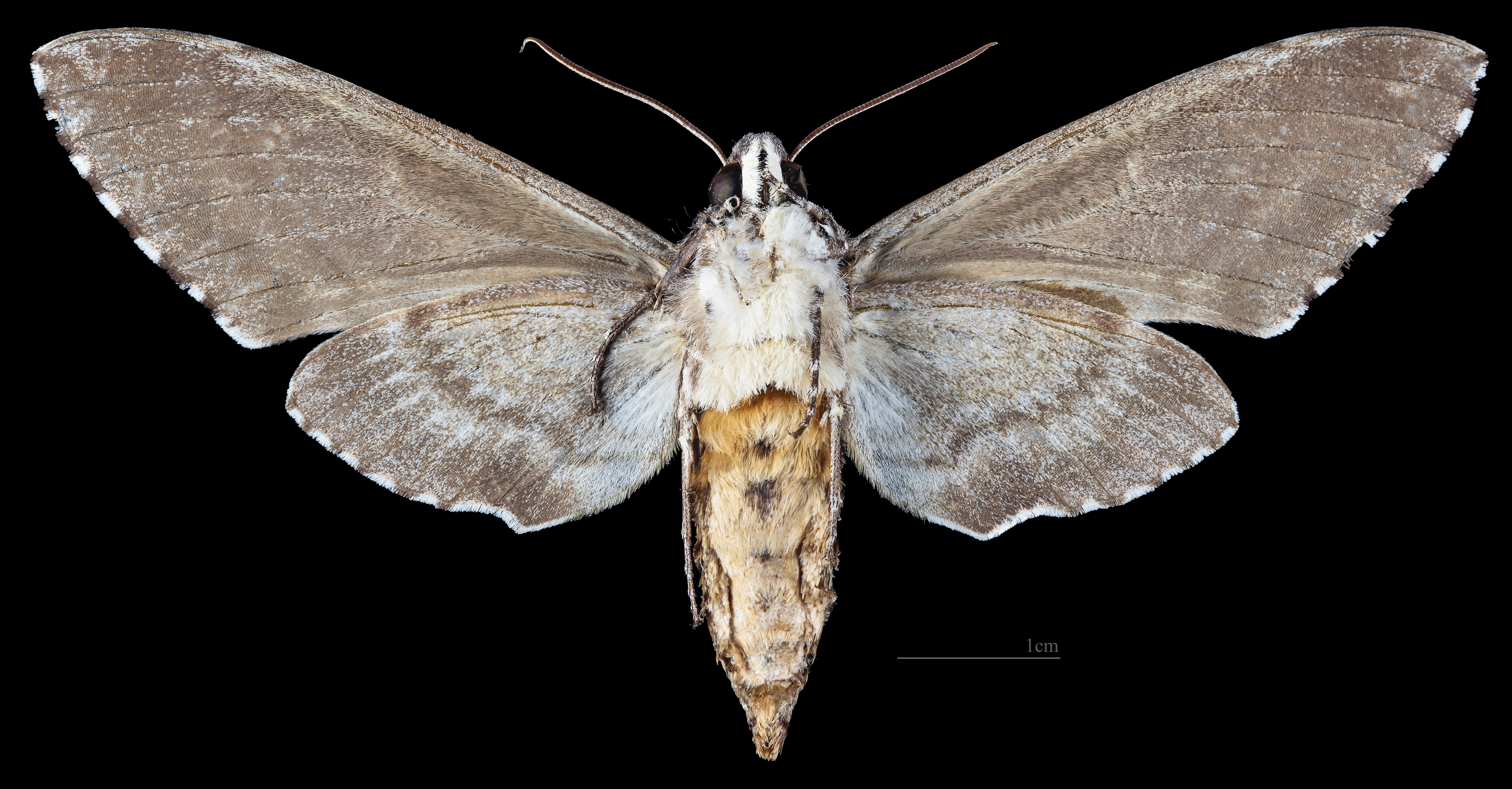
Manduca rustica calapagensis, female, ventral

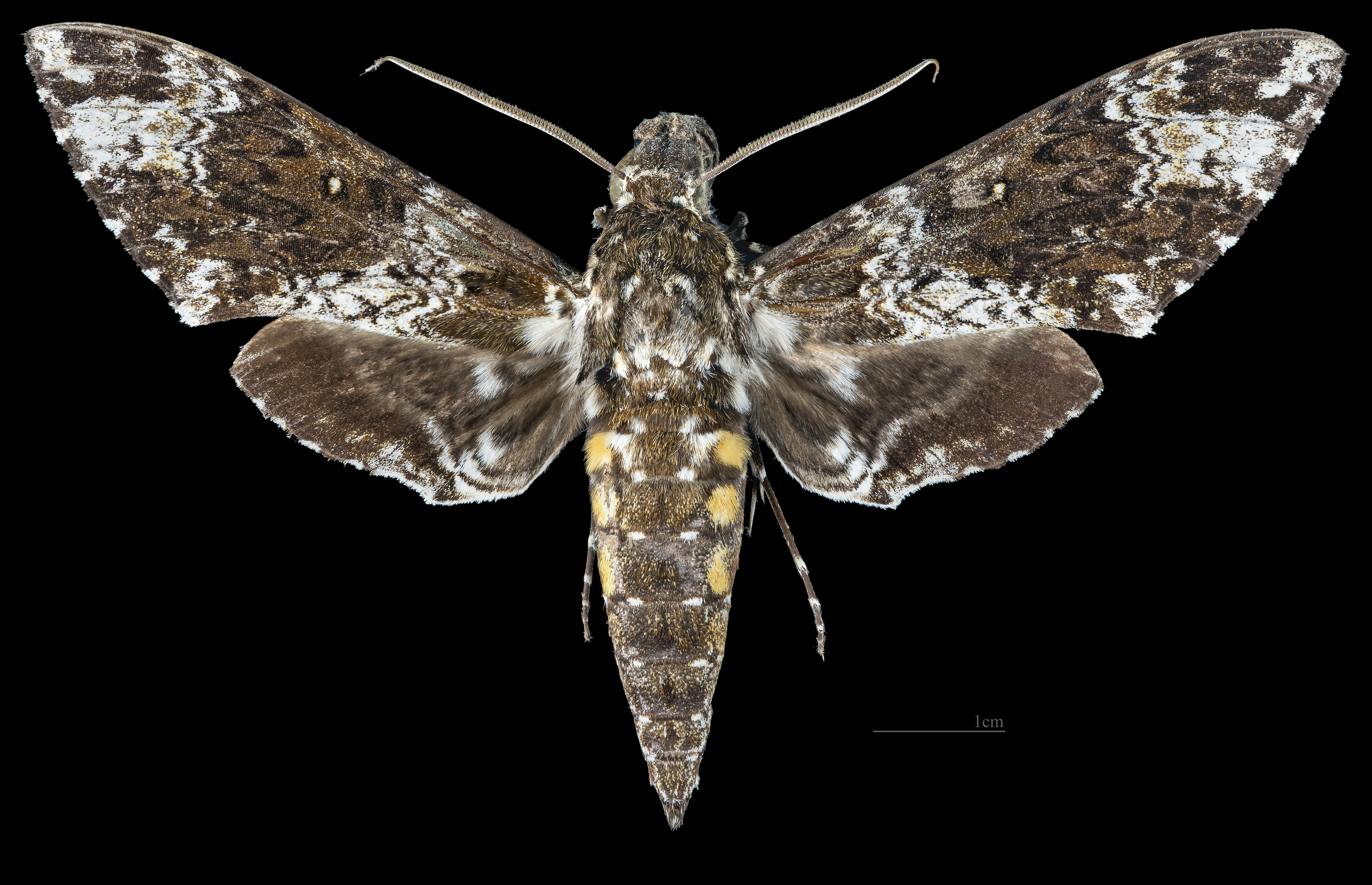
Manduca rustica cubana dorsal MHNT

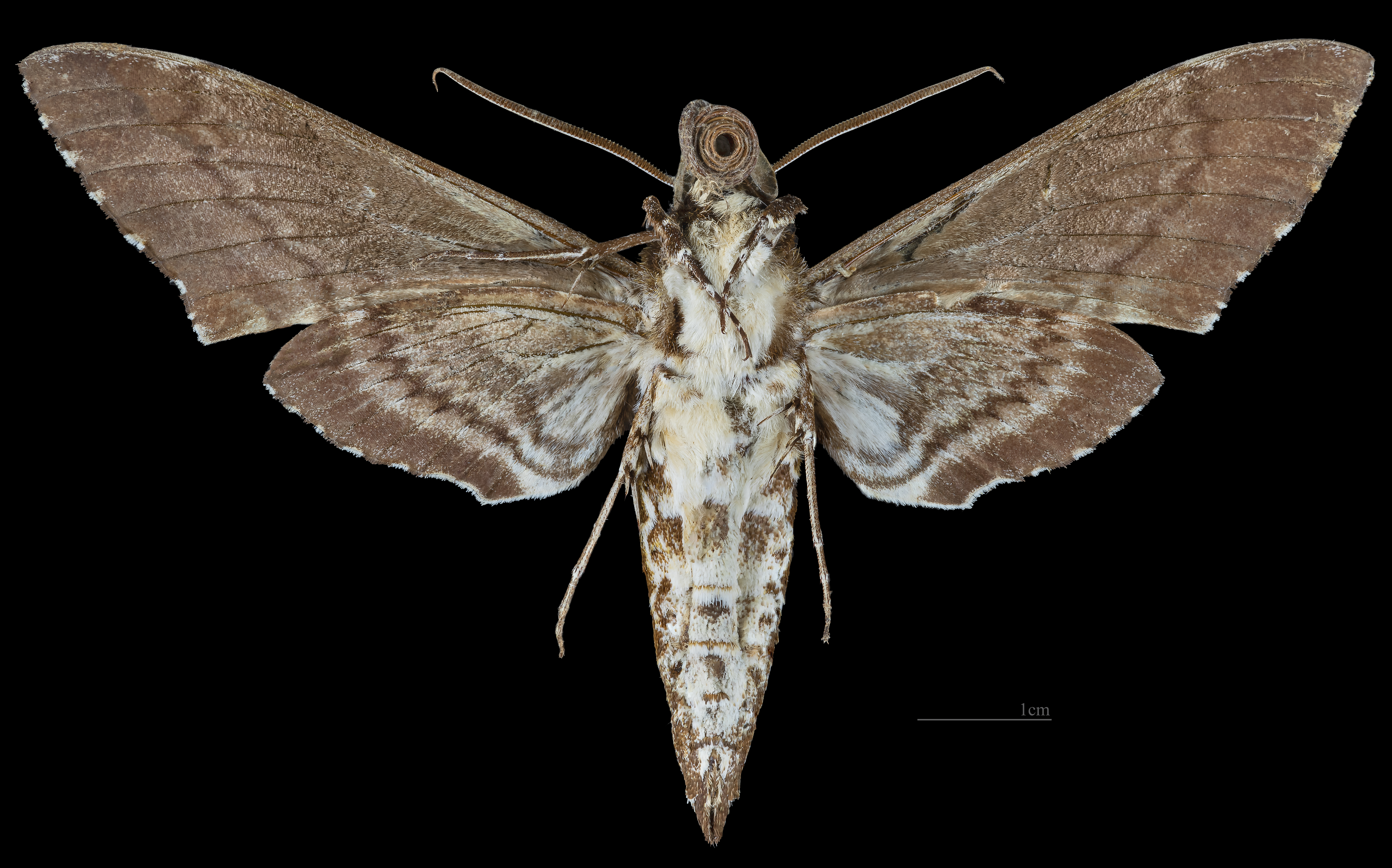
Manduca rustica cubana ventral MHNT

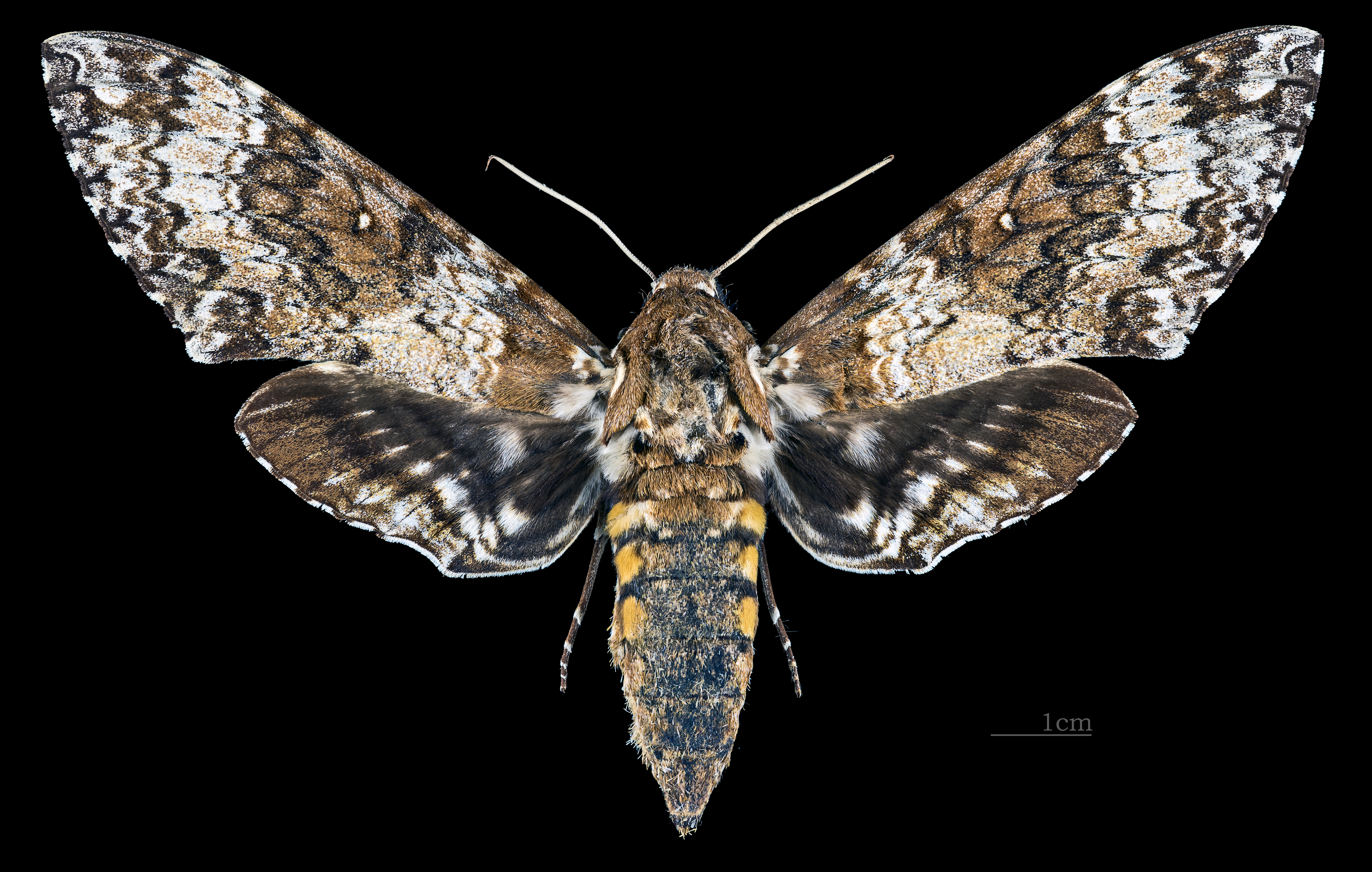
Manduca rustica harterti, dorsal view

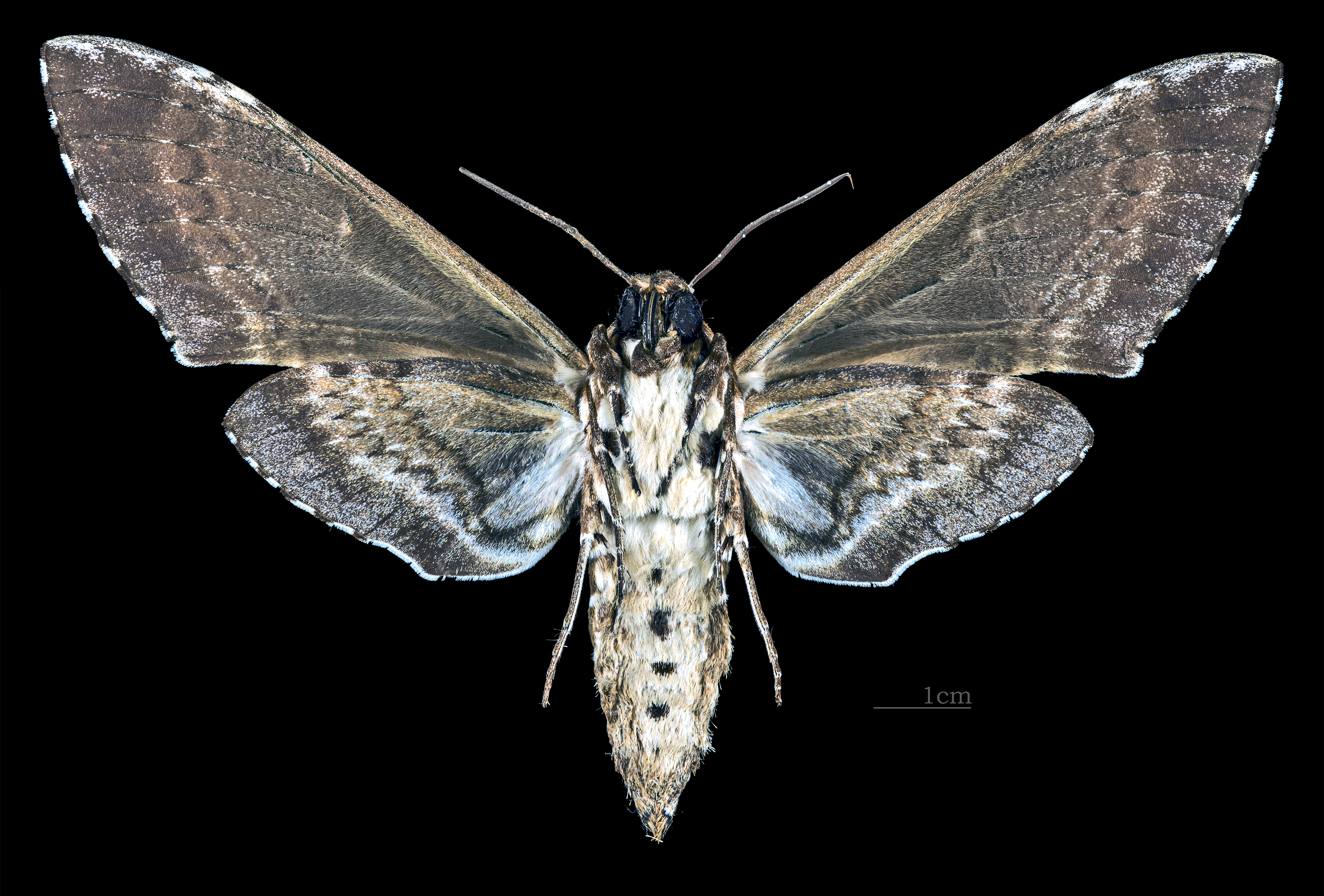
Manduca rustica harterti, ventral view

== Gallery ==
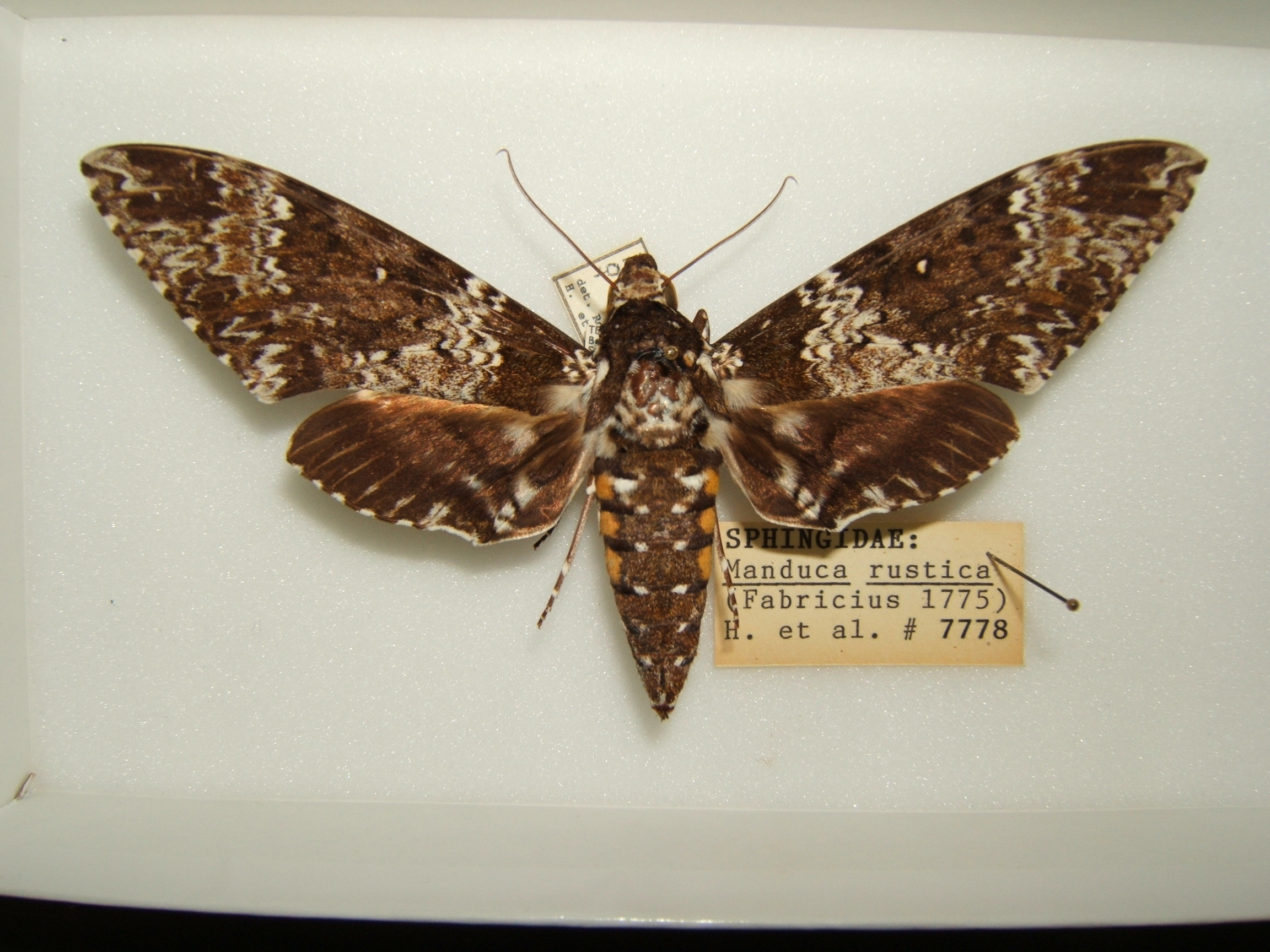
Female

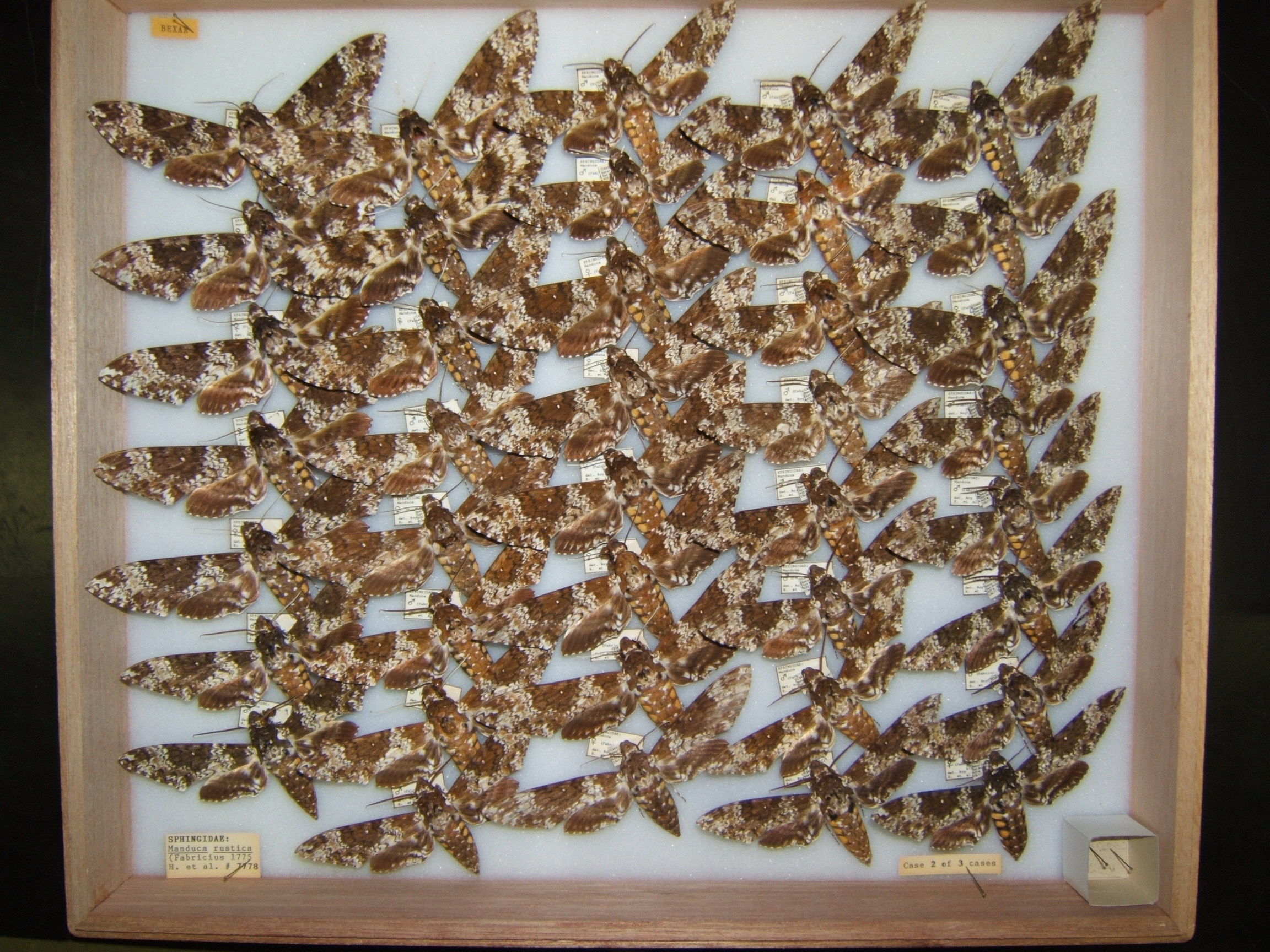
Variation

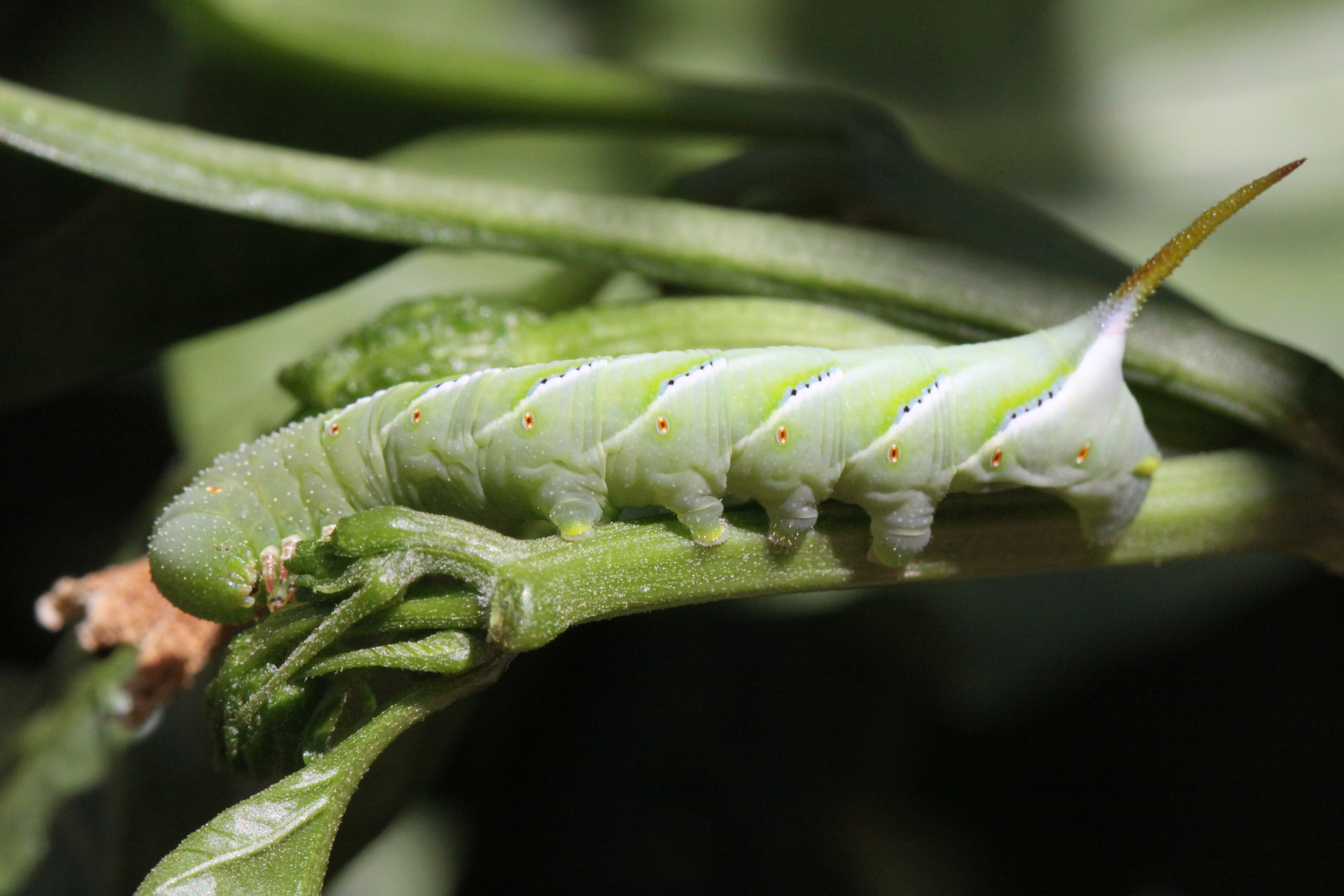
Larva

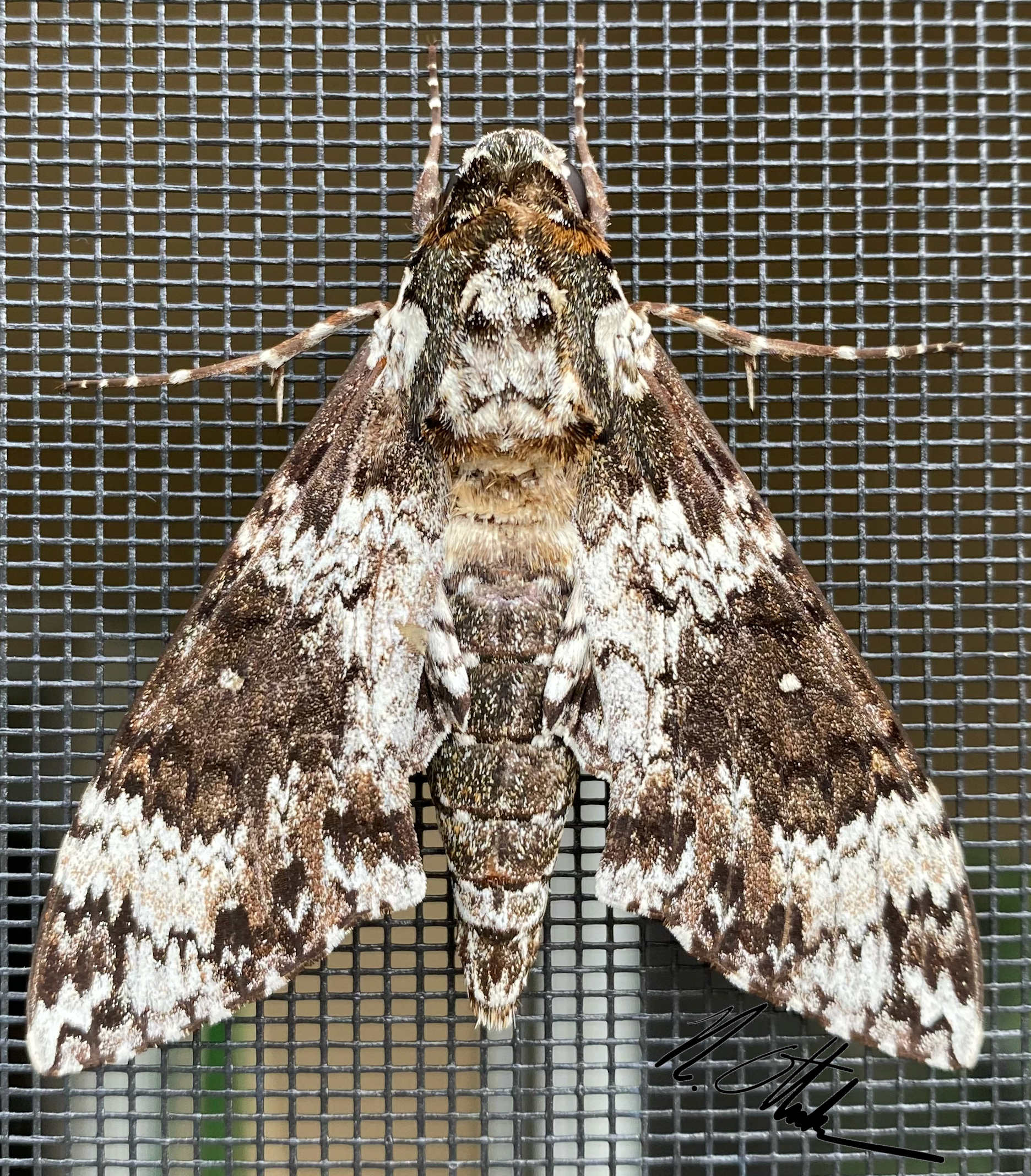
Adult

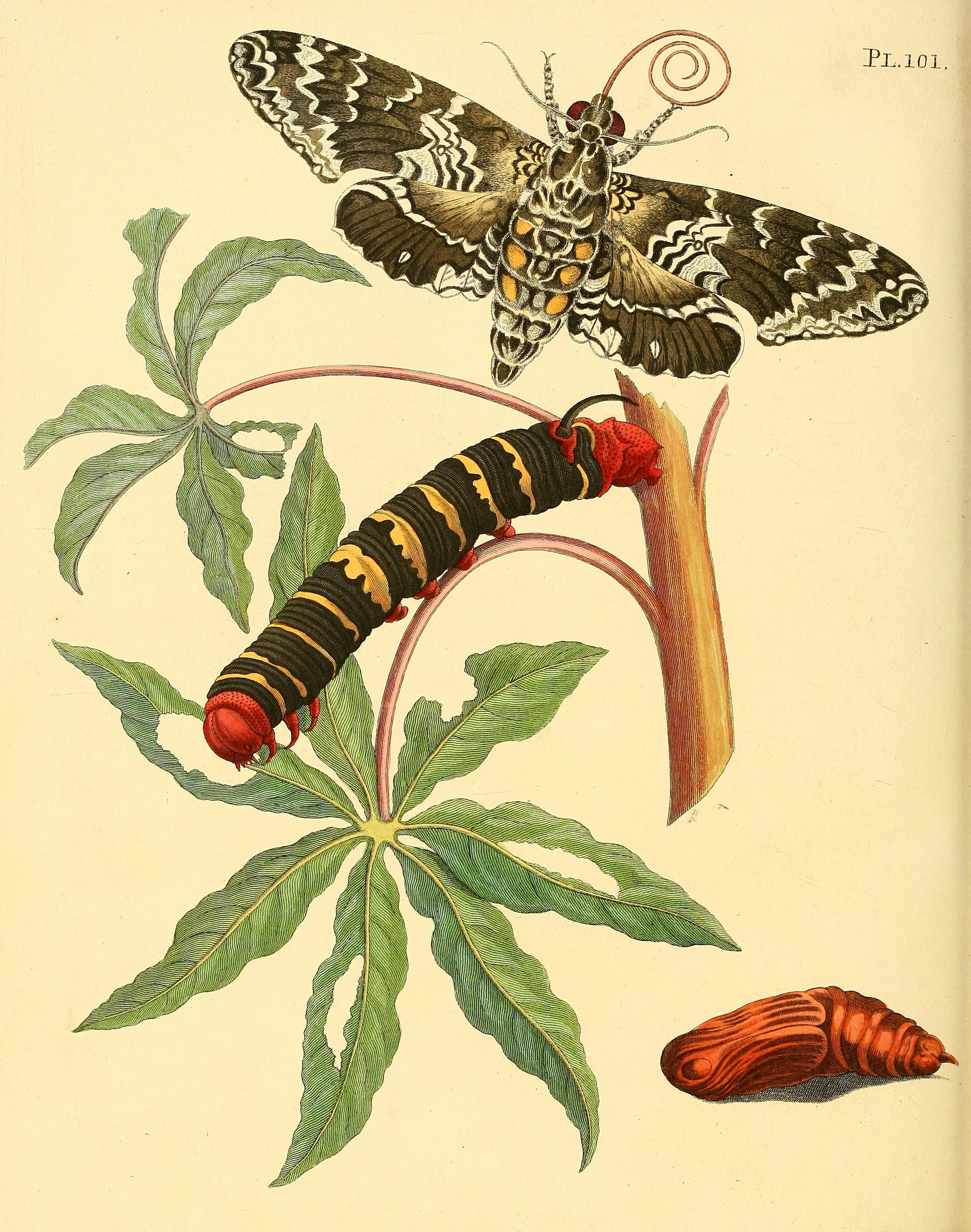
Manduca rustica (as syn. Sphinx rustica).
