= List of short species names =

Living organisms are known by scientific names. These binomial names can vary greatly in length, and some can be very short; genus or species names composed of only one letter are not allowed by any of the nomenclature codes, but any combination of two letters and above can be valid if it has not been previously used. This list of shortest species names lists the scientific binomials with the fewest letters. The longest scientific species names can be found in the list of long species names.

== 4 letters ==
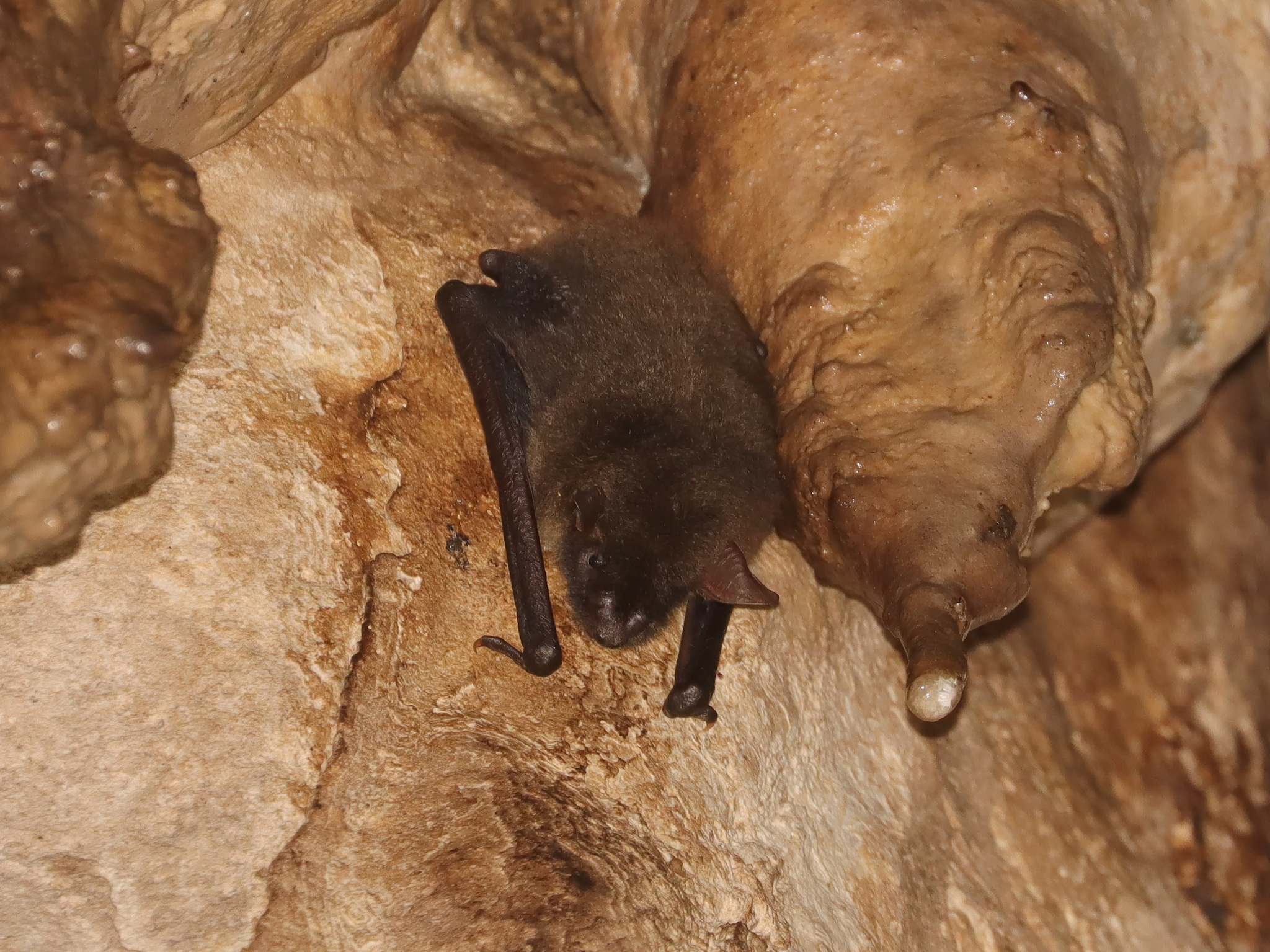
Ia io (4 letters)

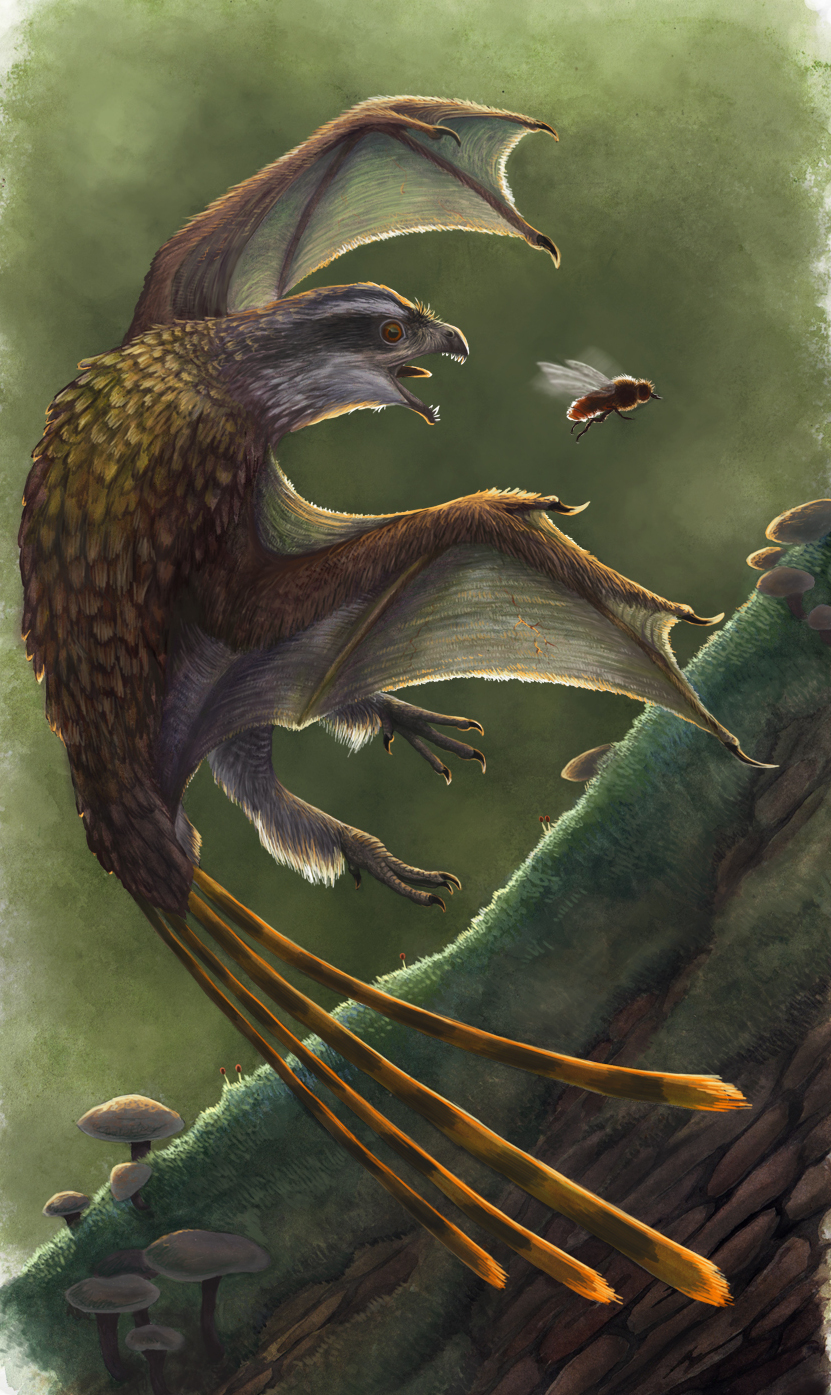
Restoration of Yi qi (4 letters)

- Ia io Thomas, 1902 – Family Vespertilionidae. The great evening bat is the largest vespertilionid bat, reaching a wingspan of just over half a metre. It occurs in tropical Asia where it lives in limestone caves. Apart from being the shortest scientific name of a living organism (and one of the shortest possible, since anything below 4 letters would not be allowed), it also has the peculiarity of being composed only of vowels. The genus Ia (ἰά) is an ancient Greek term for 'voice', 'cry' or 'shout'; the specific name has commonly been assumed to refer to Io, a woman of classical mythology, viewed as "flighty;" but chiropterologist Thomas Griffiths has theorised that it is instead to be understood as the Latin interjection ĭō, meaning 'an exclamation of joy', and that therefore the correct English translation of the binomial would be 'Shout hurrah!'; Griffiths bolsters this argument by pointing out that Oldfield Thomas subsequently named another two species with the same word (Rhogeessa io and Balantiopteryx io), thus creating a succession of "three hurrahs", and proposes that this would be Thomas's way of celebrating his induction into the Royal Society in 1901, despite having no formal training.
- †Yi qi Xu et al., 2015 – Family Scansoriopterygidae. This was a Jurassic theropod dinosaur that had an elongated finger which supported a patagium, akin to those of bats, which enabled the animal to glide between trees. The name is derived from Mandarin Chinese (翼 yì and 奇 qí, pronounced "ee chee"), meaning "strange wing".

== 5 letters ==
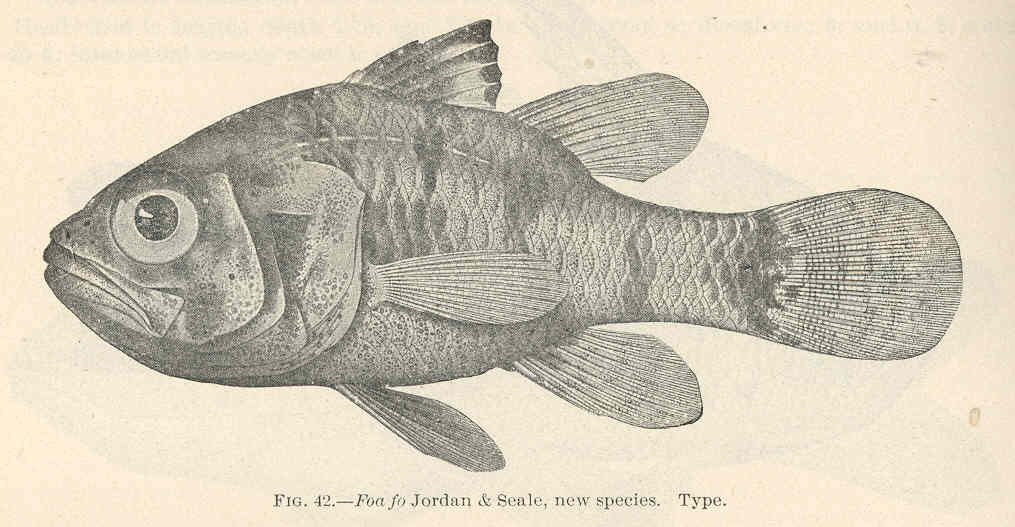
Drawing of Foa fo (5 letters)

- Aha ha Menke, 1977 – Family Crabronidae. This species of Australian wasp was named as a joke by entomologist Arnold Menke. He mentioned later that it was named for his exclamation "Aha, a new genus", when he first saw the specimen, with fellow entomologist Eric Grissell doubtfully responding "ha". It is found in the Kununurra region in Western Australia.
- †Ano da Vršanský, 2020 and †Ano si Vršanský, 2024 - family Liberiblattinidae. Two fossil cockroaches from the Jurassic of Mongolia and Kazakhstan, respectively. The genus name Ano comes from áno, meaning "yes" in Slovak (it was described by a Slovak scientist). The specific epithet for the first is from da, Russian for "yes"; so the complete name means "Yes yes", but also "refers to ¥νoδoς (anodos): an electrode through which conventional current flows into a polarised electrical device." The epithet for the second comes from Slovak si, meaning "you are", so the complete name means "Yes, you are", or "Yes, you exist".
- Foa fo D. S. Jordan & Seale, 1905 – family Apogonidae. Known as weedy cardinalfish, this is a marine fish species of Indo-Pacific distribution, the type locality being the Philippines. Both the genus and species name derive from the word fo, Samoan for "cardinalfish".
- †Hra na Vršanský & Kováčová, 2025 - family Liberiblattinidae. Another fossil cockroach, this time described from the Cretaceous of the Russian Far East. No etymological information was given, but the word hrana means "edge" in Slovak.
- Ja ana S. Ueno, 1955 – Family Carabidae. This is a blind carabid from the Ja-Ana Cave near Gifu in southern Japan. However, the original genus Ja has been reclassified as a subgenus of Jujiroa, so its valid binomial name is currently Jujiroa ana (11 letters).

== 6 letters ==
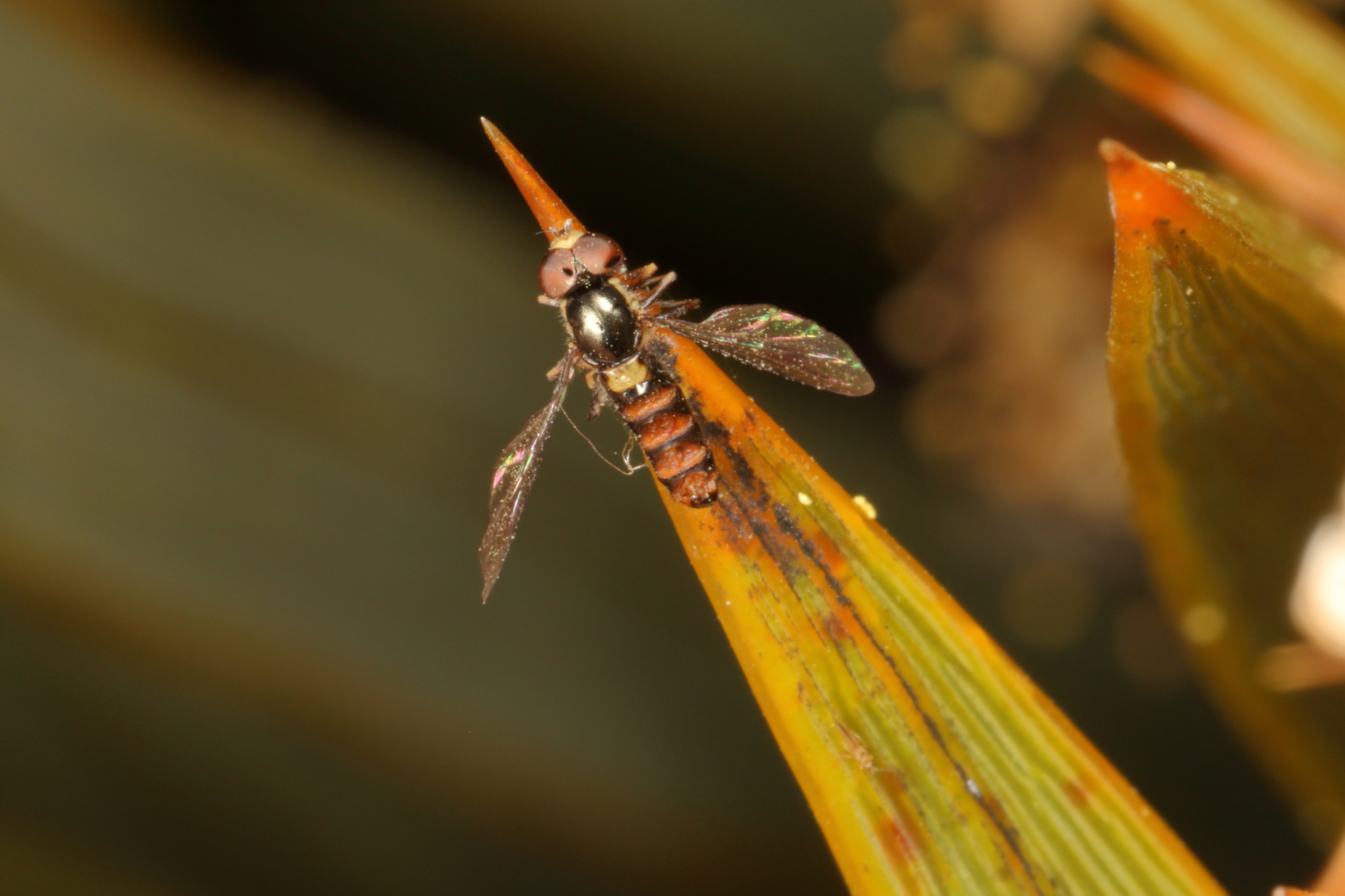
Anu una (6 letters) on the tip of a leaf

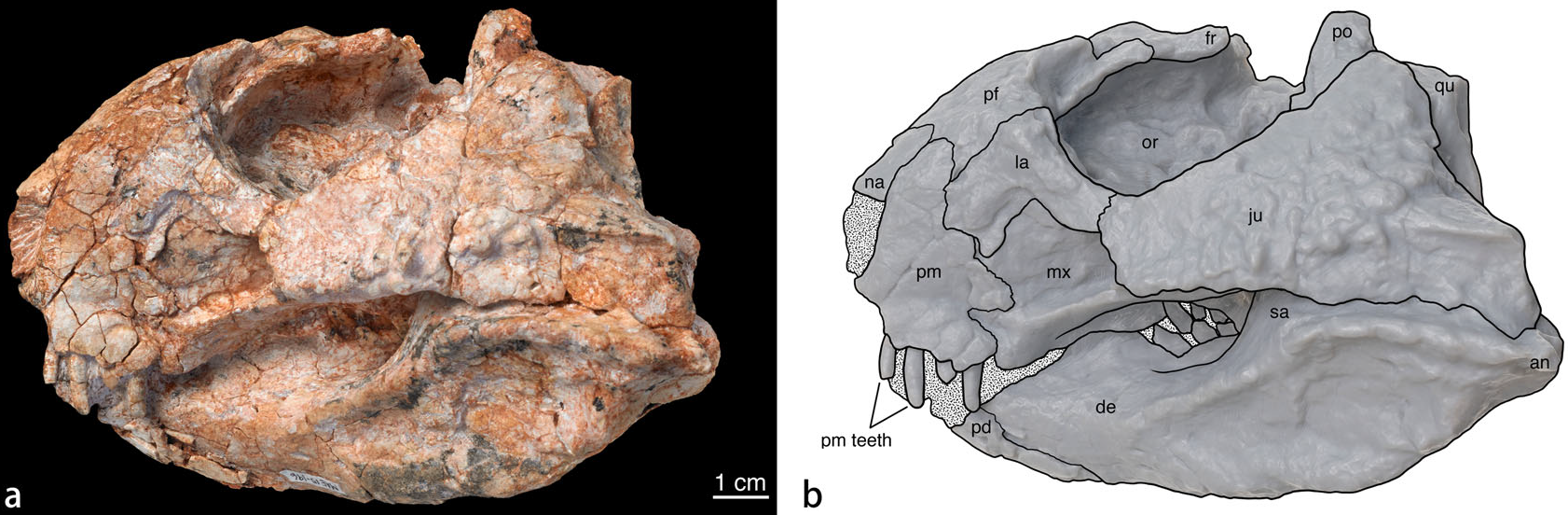
Skull of Beg tse (6 letters)

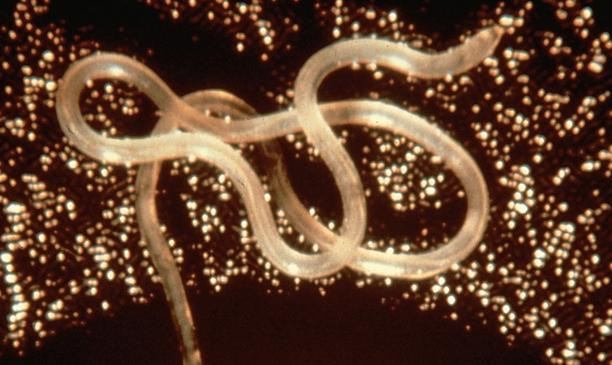
Loa loa (6 letters)

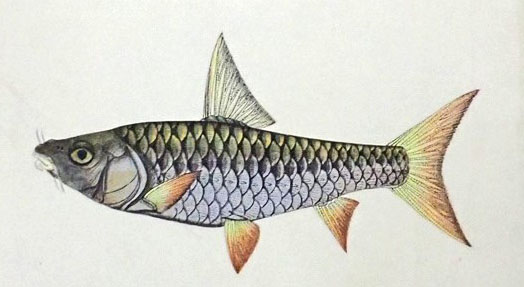
Original illustration of Tor tor (6 letters)

- Agra ce Erwin, 2010 – family Carabidae. One of more than 500 named species in the genus Agra of ground beetles; in this case, named after Terry Erwin's wife, Peruvian ornithologist Grace Servat.
- †Ano ale Vršanský et al., 2025, †Ano mal Vršanský, 2024, †Ano net Vršanský, 2020, †Ano nym Vršanský, 2020, †Ano ona Vršanský, 2024 and †Ano tak Vršanský, 2024 - family Liberiblattinidae. Six more fossil cockroaches from the Jurassic and Cretaceous periods in the aforementioned genus Ano; ale is Slovak for "but", making the full name "Yes, but"; mal is Latin for "bad", and was given in reference to the deficent preservation state of the specimen; net is Russian for "no" (thus making the name "Yes no"); nym derives from Ancient Greek Ôνυμα (ónyma), meaning "name", and is used as wordplay and "also alluding to Nym server, a pseudonym server which provides untraceable email addresses"; ona is Slovak for "she", and was given in order to make the full name a palindrome; tak is Slovak for "so", making the complete name "Yes so".
- Anu una Thompson, 2008 – family Syrphidae. A hoverfly species endemic to New Zealand. Its palindromic name was constructed as just an arbitrary combination of letters.
- †Beg tse Yu et al., 2020 – infraorder Neoceratopsia. A dinosaur from the early Cretaceous Period of Mongolia, named after the Himalayan deity Beg-tse, a god of war in pre-Buddhist Mongolian culture, often depicted with a rugose face and/or body, similar to the appearance of the preserved skull of the dinosaur.
- Doto eo Ortea & Moro, 2014 – family Dotidae. A sea slug from the Canary Islands, Spain. Its specific epithet derives "from the Latin eo, to move from one place to another, alluding to the pot warp on which it was collected, an unstable environment that facilitates the passive movement of the species."
- Ge geta de Nicéville, 1895 – family Hesperiidae. A skipper butterfly from Southeast Asia, the only species in genus Ge. No etymological explanation was given for its binomial name.
- Gea eff Levi, 1983 – family Araneidae. An orb-weaver spider from New Guinea. It was given its unusual specific name because, even after it was identified as a distinct species, it remained for years without a proper description and was referred to in several papers simply as Argiope "F".
- †Hra nie Vršanský, 2020 - family Liberiblattinidae. Another fossil cockroach from the Jurassic of Mongolia. Genus name Hra means "game" in Slovak, and nie means "no", but the complete word hranie means "playing".
- Loa loa (Cobbold, 1864) – family Onchocercidae. A filarial nematode (roundworm) that causes a disease called Loa loa filariasis or loiasis, one of the so-called neglected diseases. It is commonly known as the "African eye worm", as it localizes to the conjunctiva of the eye. It mainly inhabits rain forests in West Africa and has native origins in Ethiopia. It was originally described as Dracunculus loa, "loa" being the native word for this worm in the Congo and Gabon, and later transferred to newly created genus Loa.
- †Ol xiai Vršanský & Wang, 2017 – family Olidae. An extinct cockroach with pectinate antennae, known from Cretaceous Burmese amber. Ol means "writing" in Santali language. In addition, this combination of letters looks like "01", which is used for a common abbreviation of optical lithography. Species name xiai is named after researcher Fangyuan Xia.
- Poa fax J.H.Willis & Court – family Poaceae. This Australian grass has the shortest name of any plant. Poa (πόα) is Greek for "fodder", and fax is Latin for "torch" or "flame", referring to "its dense, spike-like inflorescence which resembles a torch with ascending tongues of flame". While the name Poa fax is accepted as valid by Flora of Australia, and some databases reflect this, such as POWO, WCSP and FloraBase, other sources such as Tropicos, WFO and GrassBase consider it a synonym, superseded by Neuropoa fax (J.H.Willis & Court) Clayton.
- Tor tor (Hamilton, 1822) – family Cyprinidae. The Tor mahseer of red-finned mahseer is a commercially important freshwater fish found in streams all over South Asia. It was originally described as Cyprinus tor; its species name derives from tora, a local name in the Ganges basin for mahseers. Subsequently, it was transferred to newly created genus Tor.
- Zig zag Miralles et al., 2026 - family Scincidae. A limbless skink from Madagascar, named "in reference to the very characteristic sinusoidal [ zigzag-shaped ] tracks left by this species when moving in the white sand."

== 7 letters ==
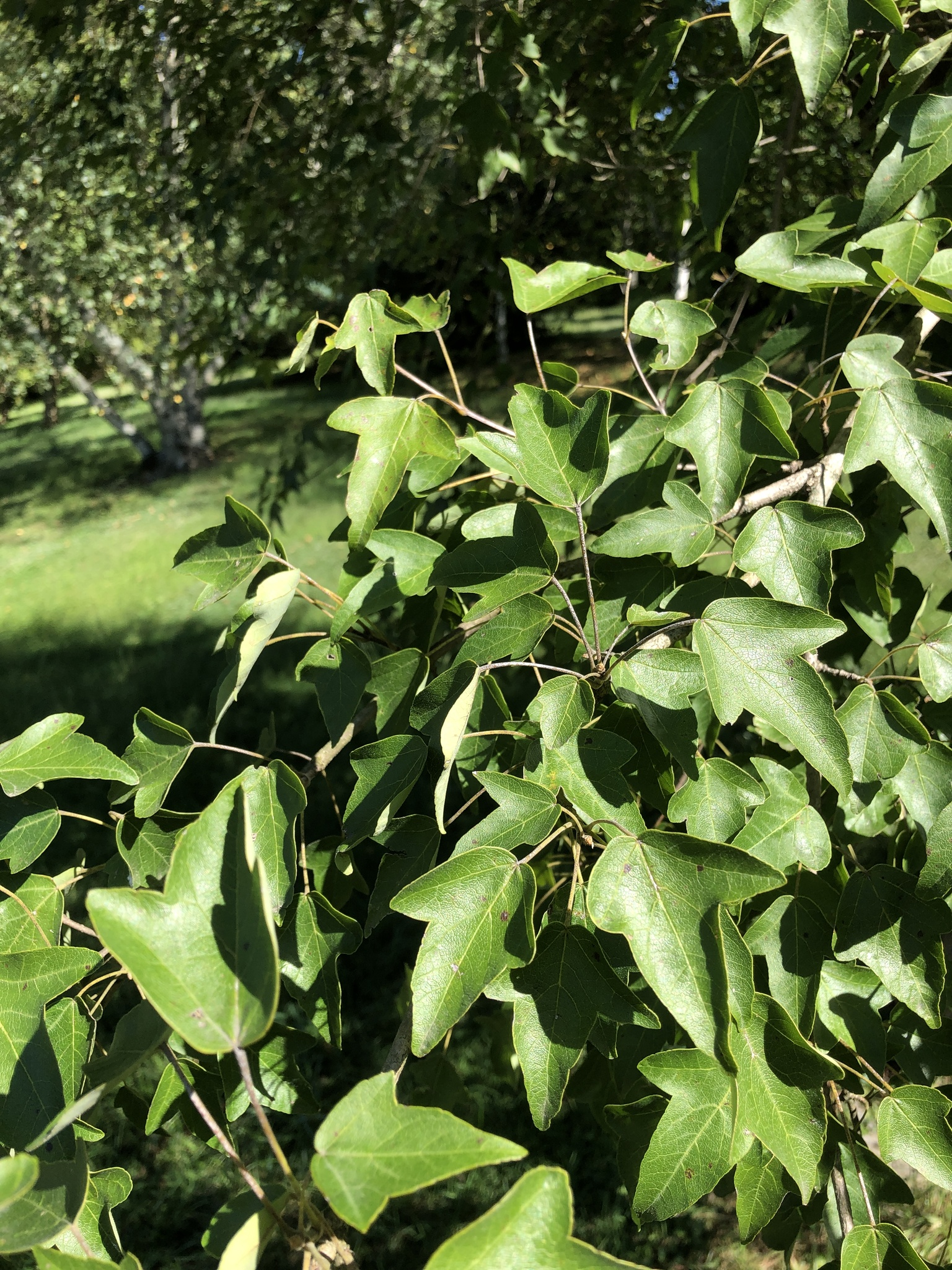
Acer yui (7 letters)

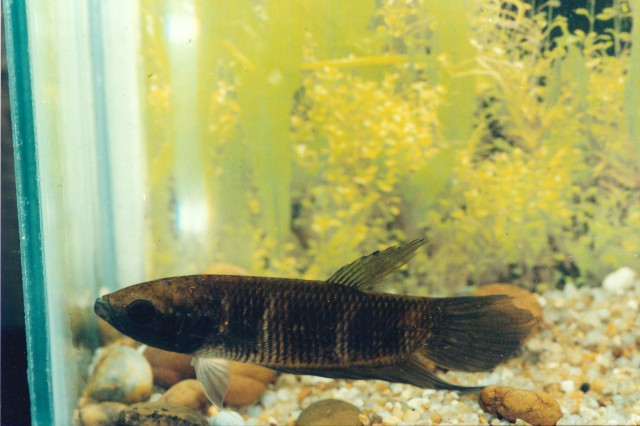
Betta pi (7 letters)

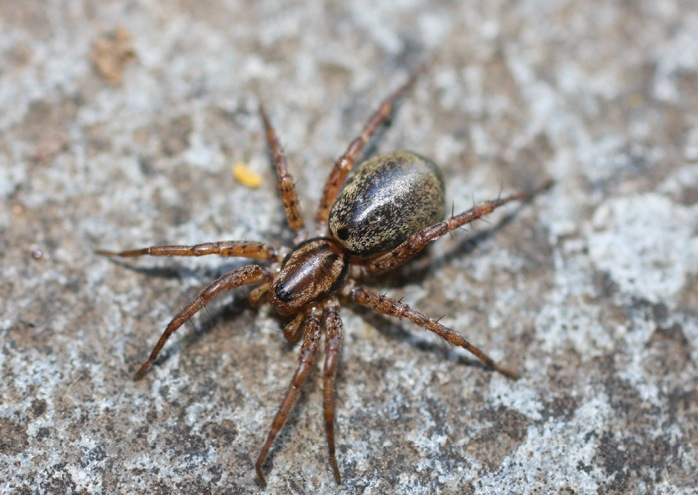
Copa kei (7 letters)

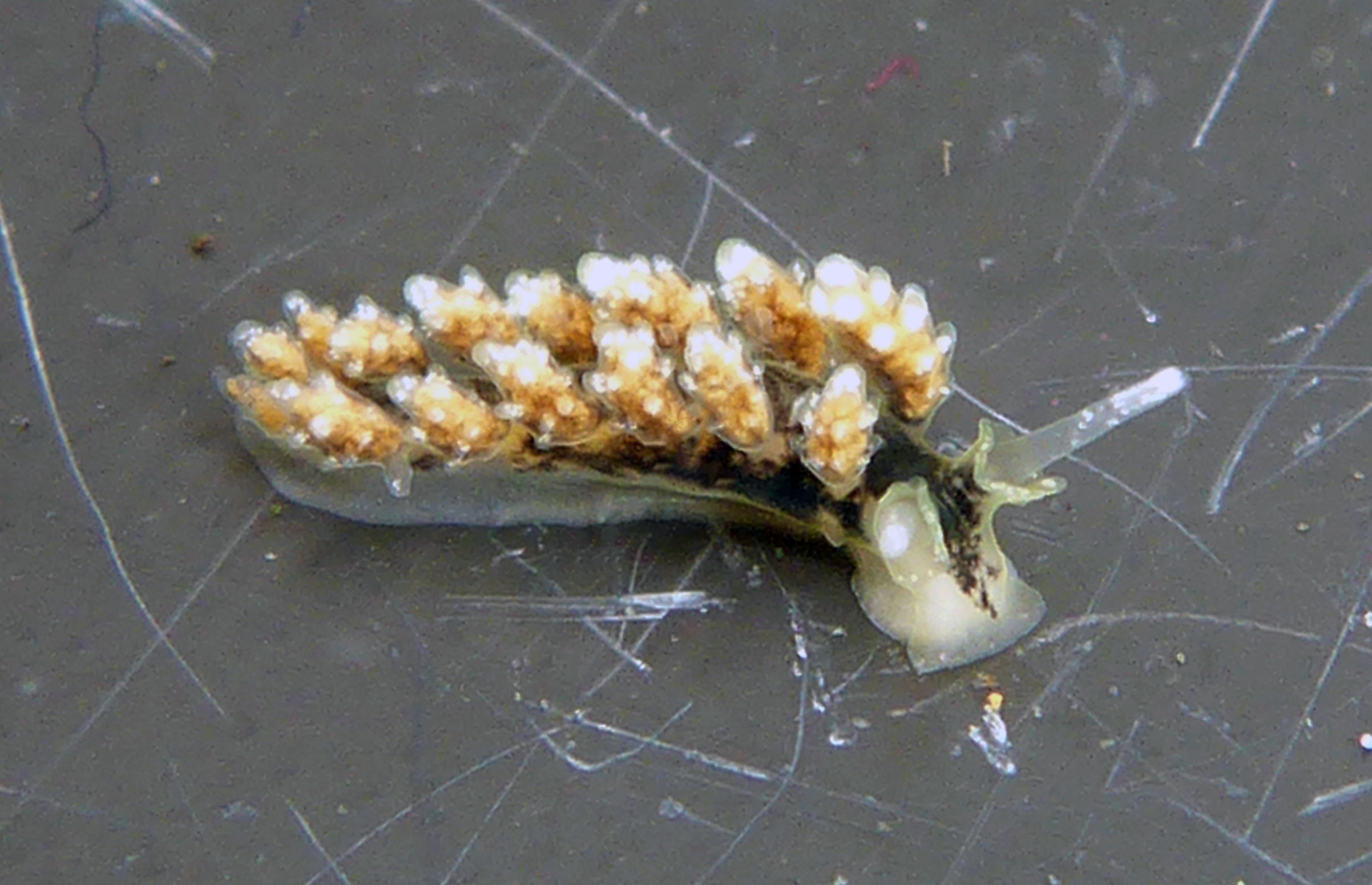
Doto kya (7 letters)

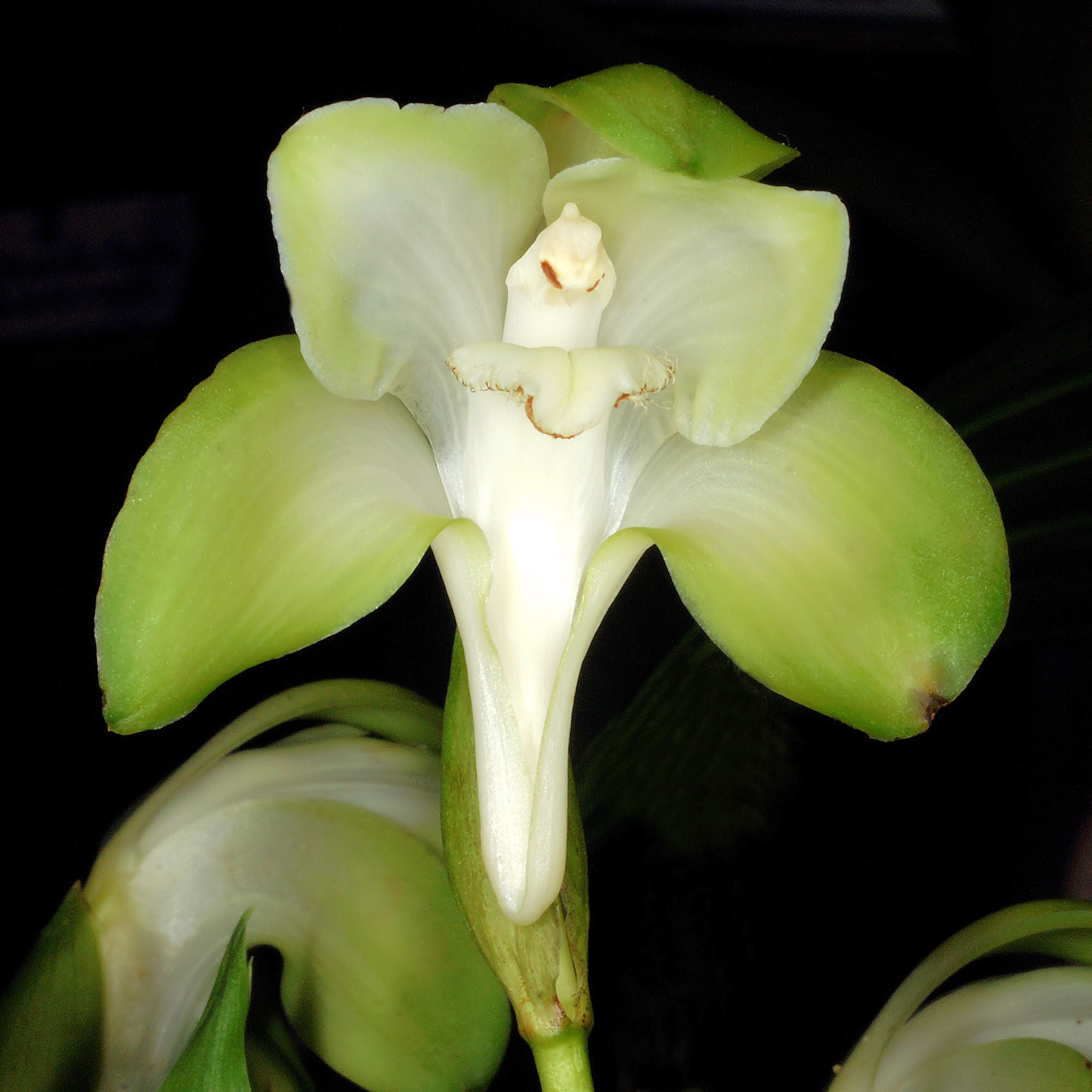
Ida lata (7 letters)

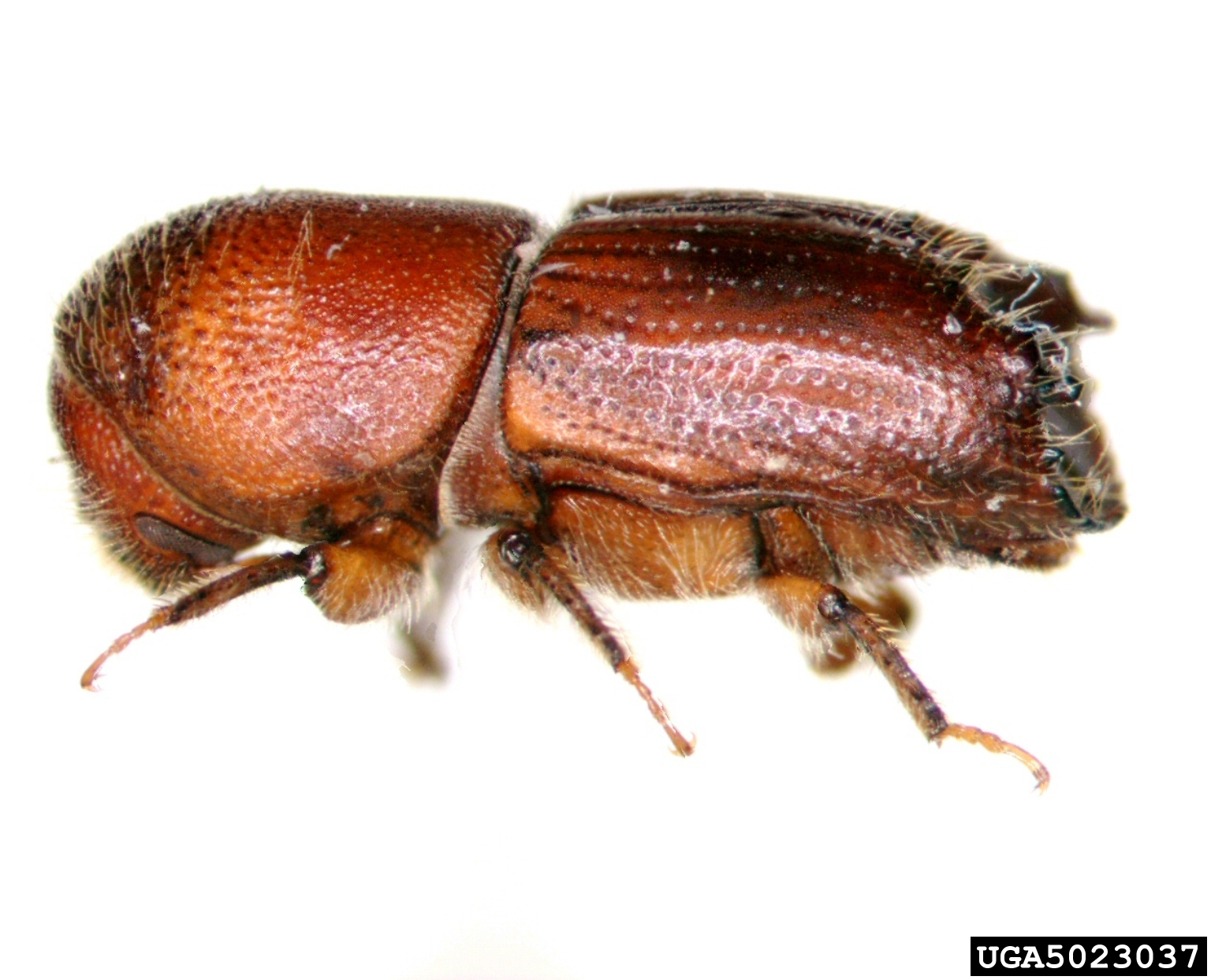
Pine engraver beetle, Ips pini (7 letters)

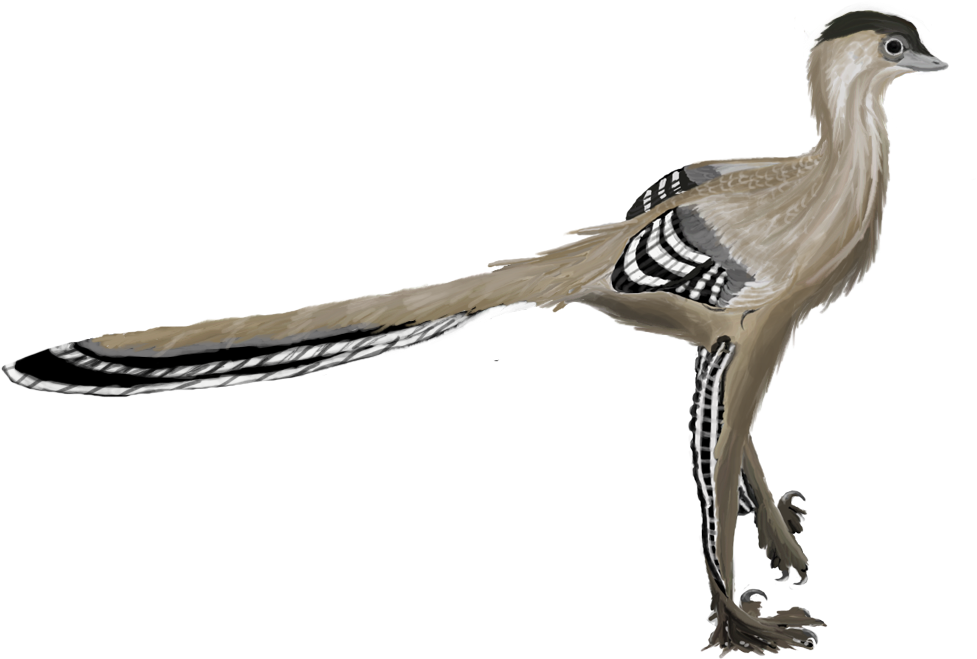
Restoration of juvenile Mei long (7 letters)

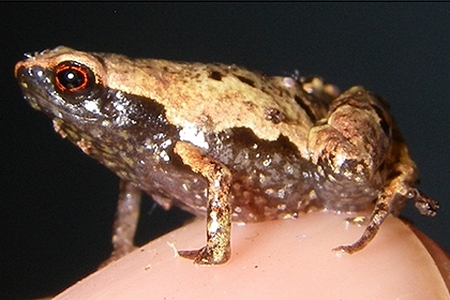
Mini mum (7 letters)

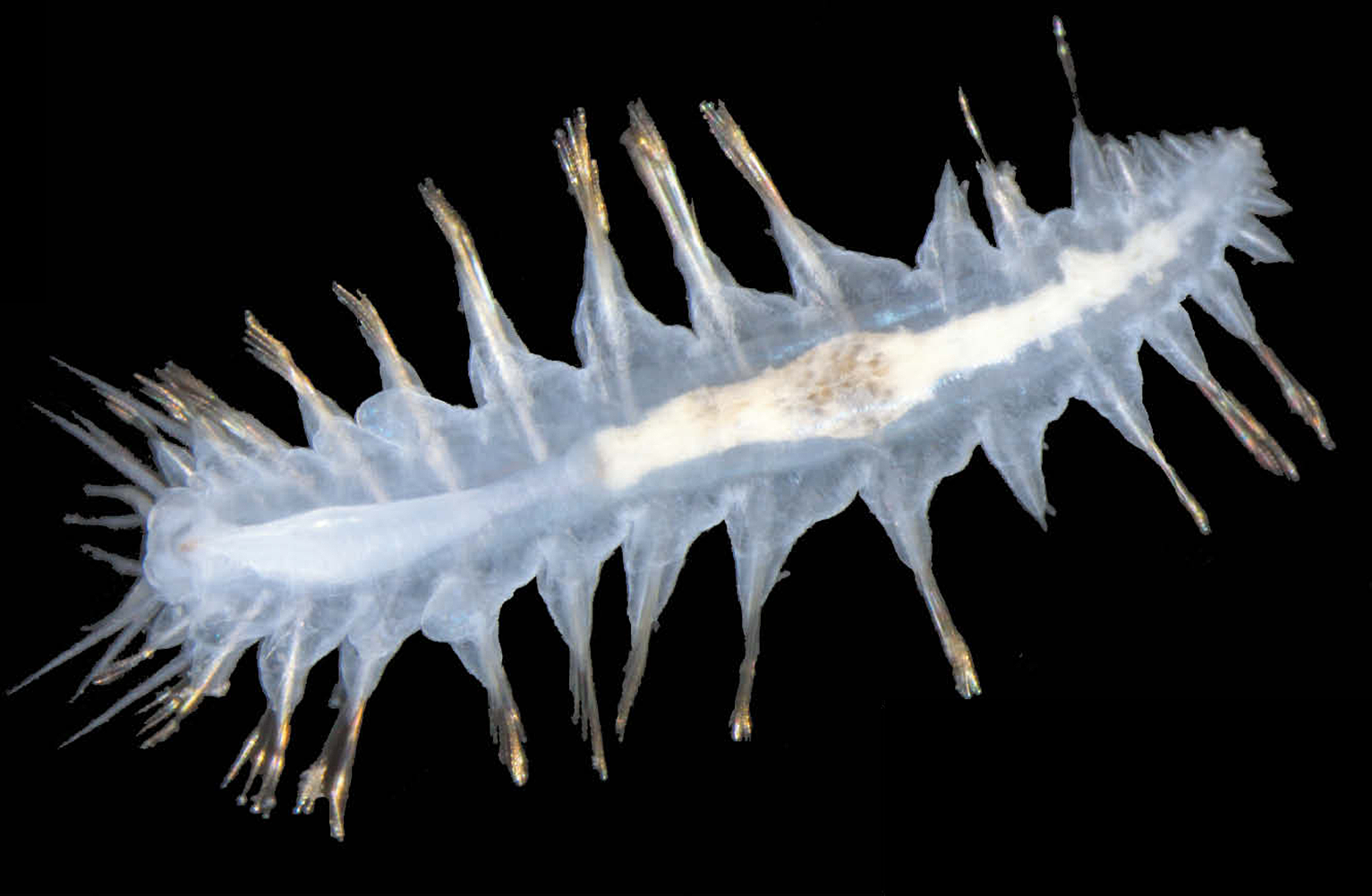
Nu aakhu (7 letters)

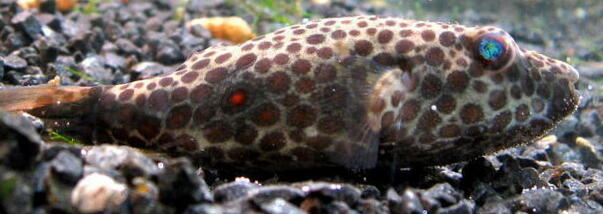
Pao abei (7 letters)

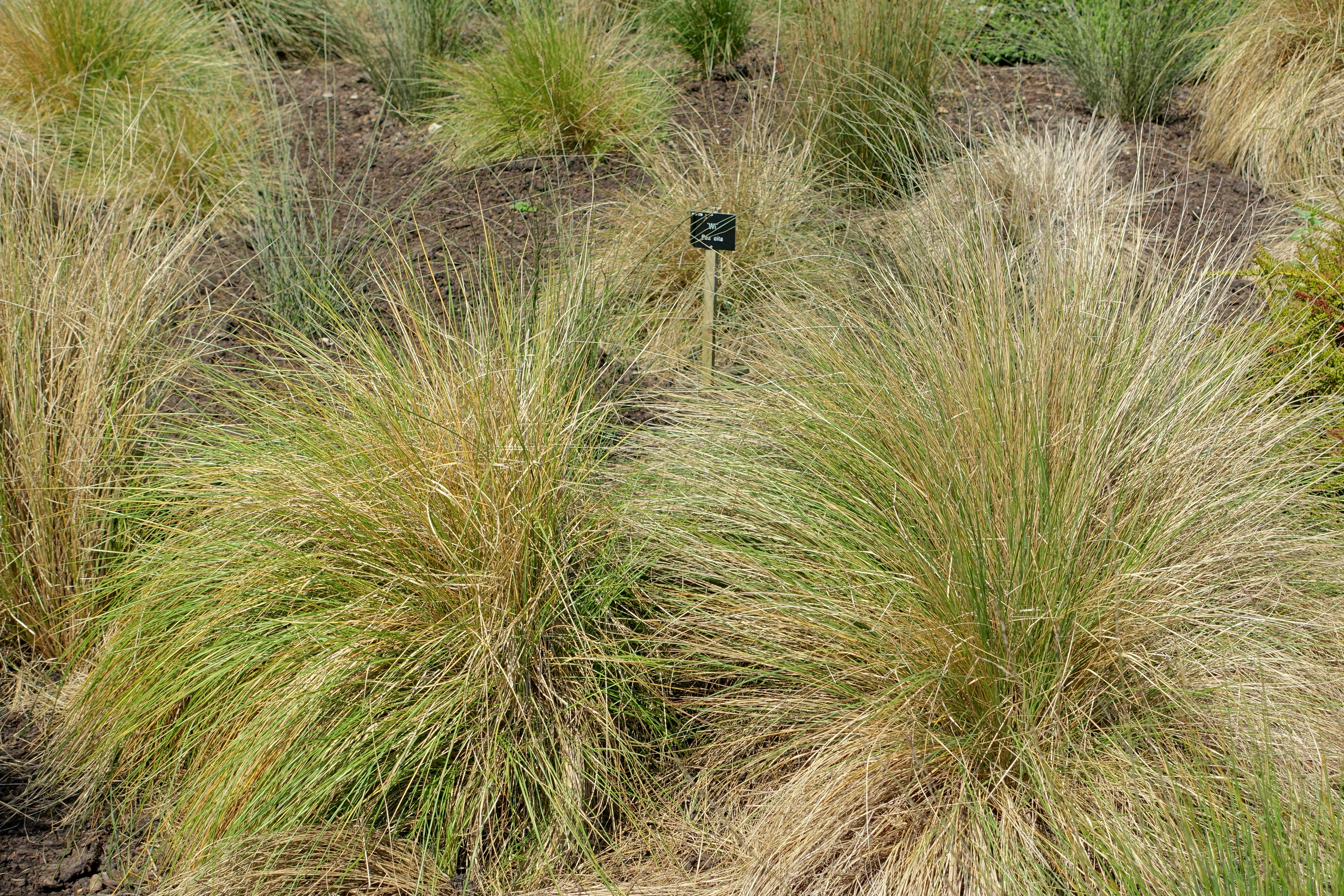
Silver tussock or wī, Poa cita (7 letters)

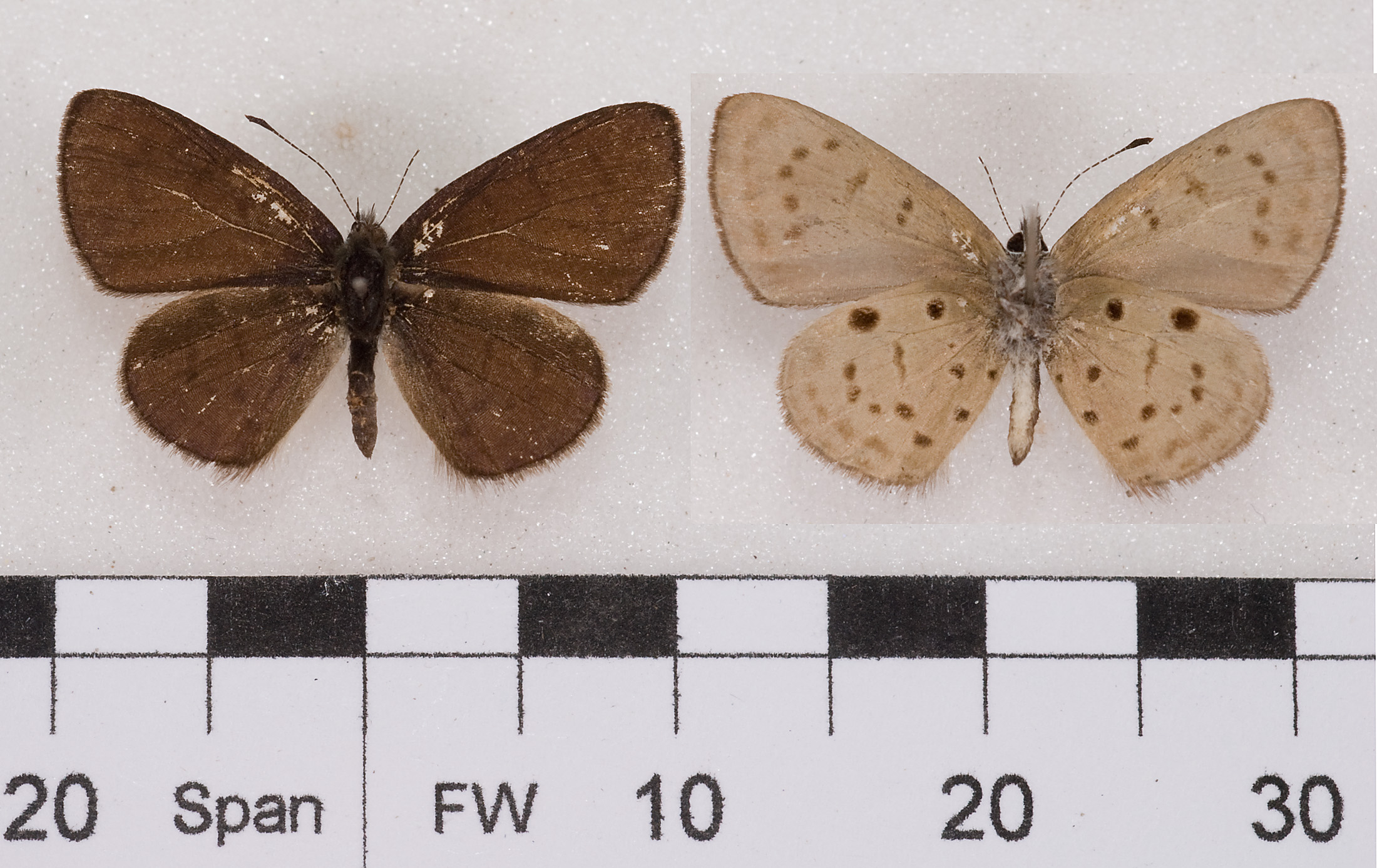
Una usta (7 letters)

- Aa erosa (Rchb.f.) Schltr. 1912, Aa macra Schltr. 1921 and Aa rosei Ames 1922 – family Orchidaceae. Three species of South American orchids that grow in the Andes. Genus Aa was erected in 1854 by Heinrich Gustav Reichenbach, apparently with the intention that it would always appear first in alphabetical listings. Another – disputed – explanation is that Reichenbach named this genus after Pieter van der Aa; the printer of the Dutch botanist Paul Hermann's Paradisus Batavus.
- Acer yui W. P. Fang (1934) – family Sapindaceae. An uncommon species of maple found only in the Gansu and Sichuan Provinces in western China.
- Agra bci Erwin, 2000, Agra dax Erwin, 2000, Agra ega Erwin, 1982, Agra liv Erwin, 2002, Agra max Erwin, 2010, Agra nex Erwin, 2000, Agra not Erwin, 2002, Agra nox Erwin, 1984 and Agra pia Liebke 1940 – family Carabidae. Nine more species of Agra beetles, found in Central and South America. Agra bci is named after Barro Colorado Island, the type locality for this species. Agra dax is named after the Star Trek character Jadzia Dax, played by actress Terry Farrell. Agra ega is named after the former name of Tefé, the type locality for this species. Agra liv is named after actress Liv Tyler. Agra max is named after entomologist Max Liebke.
- Bau antu (S.Y.Wong & P.C.Boyce) S.Y.Wong & P.C.Boyce and Bau hayi (S.Y.Wong & P.C.Boyce) S.Y.Wong & P.C.Boyce - family Araceae.
- Betta pi Tan, 1998 – family Osphronemidae. A species of fighting fish found in well-shaded peat forest blackwater swamps and creeks in Thailand and Malaysia. The specific epithet comes from the Greek letter pi, as an allusion to the shape of its throat marking.
- Bremia o Kontos & Thines - family Peronosporaceae. An oomycete found on the leaves of the smooth hawksbeard, Crepis capillaris. The specific epithet, which at one letter long is the shortest in existence, comes from "the Latin word 'o', referring to the astonishment about the diversity within the genus Bremia." Another Bremia species published in the same paper, Bremia krungthepmahanakhonamonrattanakosinmahintharayuthayamahadilokphopnoppharatratchathaniburiromudomratchaniwetmahasathanamonpimanawatansathitsakkathattiyawitsanukamprasitnonopsis, (Note: "Named after the official full name of Bangkok, which the species does not visually resemble at all." The ceremonial name of Bangkok is listed by Guinness World Records as the world's longest place name, and the ending non + -opsis roughly means "not resembling".) is the longest scientific name of any living or fossil organism, over twice as long as the previous record-holder. Article 23.2 of the International Code of Nomenclature for algae, fungi, and plants (Madrid Code), which governs the nomenclature of oomycetes, restricts the length of new specific epithets published on or after 1 January 2026 to between two and thirty letters; prior to this date, however, there were no official restrictions on their length—and these names were published just a few days before this rule came into effect, on 28 December 2025.
- Car pini Lea, 1911 – family Caridae. An Australian weevil found on pine trees, hence the specific epithet pìni.
- Cis afer Fåhræus, 1871, Cis fagi Waltl, 1839 and Cis leoi Lopes-Andrade, Gumier-Costa & Zacaro, 2003 – family Ciidae. Cis is a genus of minute tree-fungus beetles found all over the world. Cis afer, from South Africa (afer is Latin for "African"), is only known from the type specimens and no other record of it exists. In the case of Cis fagi, from Europe, its specific epithet alludes to its affinity to beech trees (genus Fagus), though it also occurs in many other types of trees, such as aspens, birches, oaks, willows, etc. Cis leoi, from Brazil, is dedicated to Léo Falqueto Vaz-de-Mello, the then-recently born son of a couple of colleagues of the scientists that described it.
- Copa kei Haddad, 2013 – family Corinnidae. A spider in the genus Copa found in South Africa. The epithet comes from its type locality: the town of Kei Mouth on the Great Kei River.
- Cora imi Lücking, Chaves & Lawrey (2016) – family Hygrophoraceae. A rare species of basidiolichen from Costa Rica, known only from the type collection, which was found at an altitude of about 3,400 m (11,200 ft) in the Los Santos Forest Reserve in Cerro de la Muerte. The specific epithet imi is an acronym for the International Mycological Institute.
- Cyrea jo Canepari & Gordon, 2016 – family Coccinellidae. A lady beetle from Colombia. No etymology was given for its name, but most species in genus Cyrea have feminine names as specific epithets, this one being the shortest.
- Doa dora Neumoegen & Dyar, 1894 – family Doidae. A moth found in Mexico, including Baja California and Guadalajara.
- Doto kya Er. Marcus, 1961 and Doto uva Er. Marcus, 1955 – family Dotidae. Two sea slugs, the first from the North American Pacific coast, the second found in Ilhabela, Brazil. The epithet kya derives from a folklore name for a seal; uva, Latin for "grape", probably refers to the characteristic cerata of genus Doto, which resemble bunches of grapes.
- Eois ewa Moraes & Stanton, 2021, Eois ops Druce, 1892 and Eois oya Moraes & Montebello, 2021 – family Geometridae. Three species of the large genus Eois of geometer moths, all from the Neotropical region. E. ops, from Mexico, is named after the Roman goddess of fertility, Ops. E. ewa and E. oya are both from Brazil, and named after female Yoruba deities or orishas: Yewa, who represents the gift of divination and intuition, as well as mutations, transformations and the perception of what is beautiful and what is ugly; and Ọya, who commands the winds, lightning and storms. These epithets were given as a tribute to women and to Brazilian black culture.
- Ero lata Keyserling, 1891 and †Ero veta Wunderlich, 2012 – family Mimetidae. Two species of pirate spiders that hunt other spiders. The first one lives in Brazil and the second one is a fossil species found in Eocene Baltic amber.
- †Han solo Turvey, 2005 – family Diplagnostidae. A fossil trilobite from the Ordovician of China. According to the original publication, the generic name Han is a reference to the Han Chinese, the largest ethnic group in China; and the specific epithet solo refers to the fact that the species is the youngest Diplagnostidae fossil found to that date, suggesting that it was the last surviving member of that family. However, Samuel Turvey has stated elsewhere that he named it after Han Solo because some friends dared him to name a species after a Star Wars character.
- Hoia hoi Avdeev & Kazachenko, 1986 – family Chondracanthidae. A parasitic copepod found in the gills of some species of goosefish from the Pacific Ocean. Both the generic and specific names honor Dr. Ju-Shei Ho of California State University.
- †Hra bavi Vršanský, 2020 and †Hra nice Vršanský, 2024 - family Liberiblattinidae. Two more fossil cockroaches from the Jurassic of Mongolia and Kazakhstan respectively. Bavi means something enjoyable or entertaining, therefore the translation of the whole name would be something like "The game is fun"; hranice is Slovak for "boundaries".
- †Ia lanna Mein & Ginsburg, 1997 - family Vespertilionidae. Another species of bat in the aforementioned genus Ia, in this case a fossil from the Miocene of Northern Thailand, named after the ancient Kingdom of Lanna within whose territory the specimens were found.
- Ida lata (Rolfe) A.Ryan & Oakeley and Ida nana (Oakeley) A.Ryan & Oakeley - family Orchidaceae. Two South American species of orchids. They were originally described as Lycaste lata and Lycaste nana, and subsequently transferred to genus Ida.
- Ips pini (Say, 1826) – family Curculionidae. The common pine engraver, a North American species of typical bark beetle. Originally described as Bostrichus pini and subsequently transferred to genus Ips.
- Lon azin (Godman, 1900) – family Hesperiidae. A skipper butterfly from Colombia. Originally assigned the name Phycanassa azin, with no explanation of the specific epithet. Subsequently, it was transferred to genus Lon, which was formed from the last syllable of the type species name (Lon zabulon).
- May norm Jäger & Krehenwinkel, 2015 and May rudy Jäger & Krehenwinkel, 2015 – family Sparassidae. Two species of huntsman spider from Namibia. The genus May is named after Bruno May, a private individual who contributed sponsorship to the research though a donation to BIOPAT e.V.; The specific epithets norm and rudy honour arachnologists Norman I. Platnick and Rudy Jocqué respectively.
- †Mei long Xu & Norell, 2004 – family Troodontidae. A duck-sized feathered dinosaur from the Early Cretaceous of Liaoning, China. Its binomial name (Chinese 寐 mèi and 龍 lóng), means "sleeping dragon". Like Yi qi, it was named by prolific Chinese paleontologist Xu Xing.
- Mini mum Scherz et al., 2019 – family Microhylidae. The type species of the genus Mini, which are extremely small (8–15 mm (0.3–0.6 in)) frogs endemic to Madagascar, among the smallest vertebrates known to science.
- Mus bufo (Thomas, 1906) – family Muridae. The toad mouse, found in Burundi, Democratic Republic of the Congo, Rwanda, and Uganda. Its natural habitats are subtropical or tropical moist montane forests and arable land. Mus and bufo are Latin for "mouse" and "toad", respectively. It was originally described as Leggada bufo, but genus Leggada was subsequently synonymised with Mus.
- Nu aakhu Bonifácio & Menot, 2018 – family Polynoidae. A scale worm found in the Clarion-Clipperton Fracture Zone. The genus and species names are derived from ancient Egyptian religion: "'Nu' refers to the deification of the primordial watery abyss whence all life came, also known as 'the Father of the Gods' and 'the Eldest'."; "'áakhu' is one of the elements that compose the human soul. An 'áakhu' is the glorified spirit or a blessed soul which has passed the final judgement (the Weighing of the Heart). The term refers to the translucent character of the body of this worm."
- †Nula sis Vršanský, 2008 - family Blattulidae. Another fossil cockroach, in this case a larva found in amber from the Cretaceous of France. Genus name Nula (meaning zero) alludes to the fact that the specimen did not complete its lifecycle. The specific name sis is after Latin "if you like it", and also an abbreviation of the type locality, Sisteron.
- Oia lata Zhang & Peng 2025 – family Linyphiidae. A dwarf spider from Hunan, China. No etymological explanation was given when genus Oia was established in 1973; the specific name lata is latin for "broad", referring to the broad prolateral tibial apophysis in male palp.
- †Omma lii Jarzembowski, Wang & Zheng, 2017 – family Ommatidae. A fossil beetle found in Cretaceous Burmese amber. The species name is after its collector, Mr. Jun Li from Jinan, China.
- Pao abei (Roberts, 1998) – family Tetraodontidae. A species of freshwater pufferfish found in the Mekong, Chao Phraya and Mae Klong river basins in Southeast Asia. It was originally described as Tetraodon abei, the specific name honoring Japanese ichthyologist Tokiharu Abe. It was subsequently transferred to genus Pao, which derives from the local name of pufferfishes in Thai and Lao languages, pla pao and pa pao, respectively, with pla and pa meaning "fish", and pao meaning "purse".
- Pieza pi Evenhuis, 2002 – family Mythicomyiidae. A small fly found in Bahamas, Turks and Caicos and Mexico. Entomologist Neal Evenhuis, known for his playful binomials, created the genus Pieza, explaining it as "derived from the Greek "πιεζοσ" = to squeeze, (Note: However, "πιεζοσ" is not a Greek word; this must be the result of a misreading. The Ancient Greek verb is πιέζω.) referring to the peculiar shape of the sperm pump and apical valve of the female genitalia", and then used it to generate some phonetic puns, in this species (pronounced like "pizza pie"), and others such as Pieza deresistans (pièce de résistance), Pieza kake ("piece of cake") and Pieza rhea ("pizzeria").
- Pison eu Menke, 1988 – family Crabronidae. Pison is an old and well-studied genus of wasps, created in the early 19th century and containing over 150 species. Arnold Menke (who also named Aha ha) named many of them in a 1988 taxonomic revision. The stated etymology is that "The name eu, treated as a noun in apposition, is based on the Greek prefix meaning 'true' or 'good', a reference to the fact that the species is valid"; however, it is believed that in this case he again was engaging in some jocular wordplay (its pronunciation would be similar to "piss on you").
- Poa alta Hitchc., Poa anae Tovar, Poa cita Edgar, Poa laxa Haenke, Poa maia Edgar and Poa orba N.G.Walsh – family Poaceae. Another six species of grass of the genus Poa. The specific epithet alta, Latin for "tall", refers to this species being "unusually tall, with elongate blades." Poa anae is named after botanist Ana Crespo. The epithet cita, Latin for "quick, swift", refers to the rapid growth of this species, known as silver tussock or wī. Poa maia is named after Maia, one of the stars in the Pleiades. The epithet of Poa orba derives from orbus, Latin for "orphan", and "alludes to its long rejection as an indigenous plant by [local] botanists, and also to its unclear phylogenetic relationship to other native Poa species."
- †Sus houi Qi, Ho & Chang, 1999 and †Sus peii Han, 1987 – family Suidae. Two extinct species of pigs from the Pleistocene of Taiwan and China, respectively. The specific name houi honors Mr Hou Liren, the collector of the fossil; the name peii honours Chinese paleontologist Pei Wenzhong.
- Tor ater Roberts, 1999 – family Cyprinidae. Another species in the aforementioned genus of freshwater fish Tor. Ater means "dark" in Latin and refers to the dark coloration of this mahseer, which is found in Laos.
- Udea nea (Strand 1918) – family Crambidae. A grass moth from Taiwan; originally described as Pionea nea, and subsequently transferred to genus Udea.
- Ufo abei Melika & Pujade-Villar, 2005 – family Cynipidae. A gall wasp from Japan. Its genus name Ufo comes from the common phrase "unidentified flying object", in this case applied because the researchers did not know what the wasp was when they first saw it. The specific name abei honors Japanese entomologist Yoshihisa Abe.
- Una usta (Distant, 1886) – family Lycaenidae. A small butterfly found in India and Southeast Asia. It was originally described as Zizera usta, and subsequently transferred to genus Una.
- Xya atra Günther, 1995, Xya muta (Tindale, 1928) and Xya royi Günther, 1982 - family Tridactylidae. Three species of pygmy mole crickets of the genus Xya. The first one is named for its black colour. The second was originally described as Tridactylus mutus but subsequently transferred to genus Xya; no etymological information was given, but the epithet (meaning "mute" in latin) implies it is less noisy than other similar species. The third one is named after French entomologist Roger Roy.
- Ytu zeus Reichardt, 1973 – family Torridincolidae. A Brazilian beetle, the type species of genus Ytu (Guaraní for "cascade, waterfall"), and one of many in this genus named after ancient Greek deities; as type species, it takes the name of Zeus, king of the gods of Olympus.
- Zea mays L. – family Poaceae. This is the scientific name of maize, i.e. corn. Generic name Zea is derived from the Greek name (ζειά) for another cereal grain (possibly spelt); the specific epithet derives from the indigenous Taíno word for the plant, mahiz.
