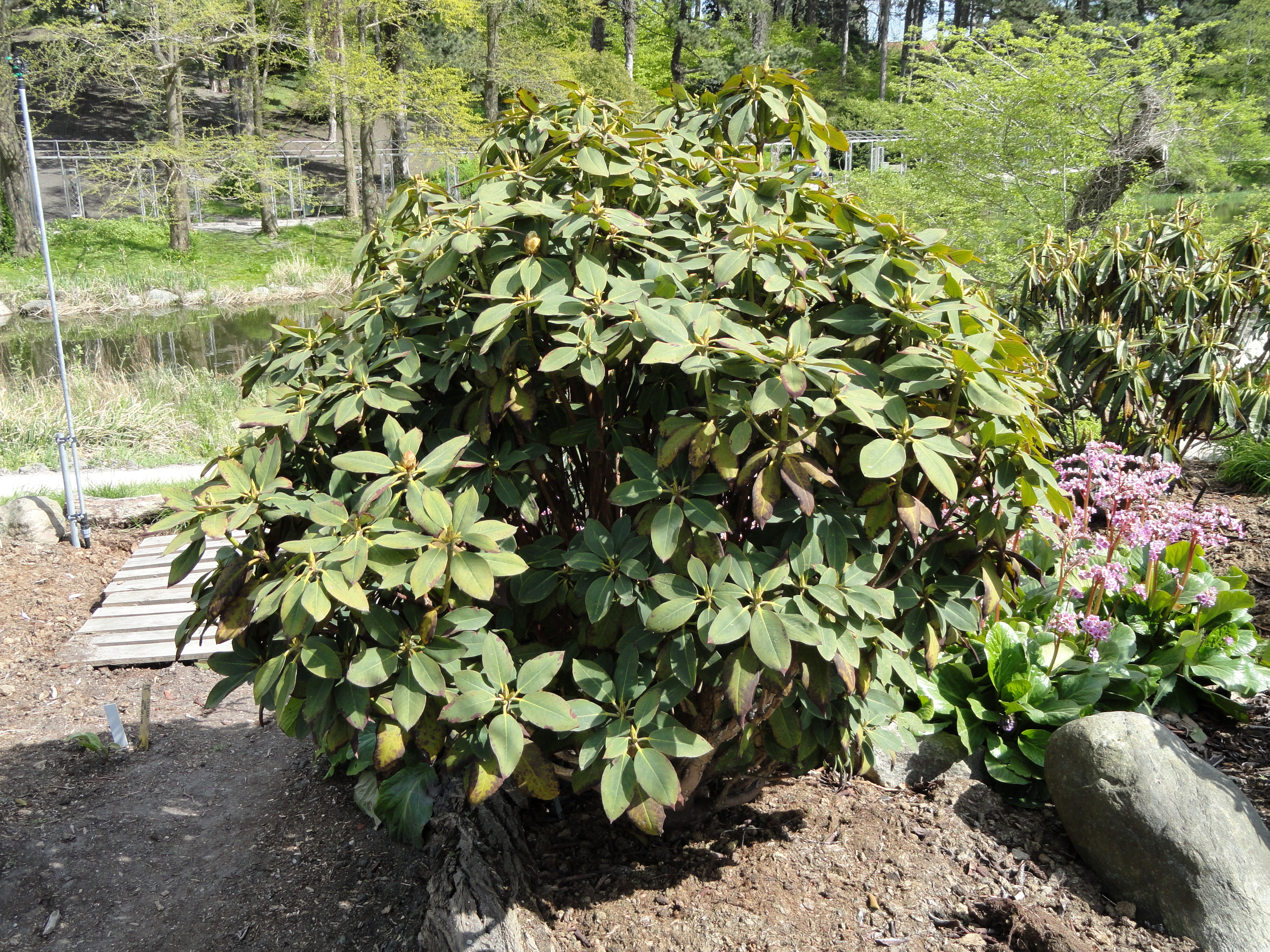
- Rhododendron sikangense var. exquisitum

Scientific classification
- Kingdom: Plantae
- Clade: Tracheophytes
- Clade: Angiosperms
- Clade: Eudicots
- Clade: Asterids
- Order: Ericales
- Family: Ericaceae
- Genus: Rhododendron
- Species: R. sikangense

Binomial name
- Rhododendron sikangense W.P.Fang

= Rhododendron sikangense =

Species of plant

Rhododendron sikangense (川西杜鹃) is a rhododendron species native to western Sichuan and northeastern Yunnan in China (the area of the former province of Sikang for which it is named), where it grows at altitudes of 2,800–4,500 m (9,200–14,800 ft). It is a shrub or small tree that grows to 3–5 m (9.8–16.4 ft) in height, with leathery leaves that are oblong-elliptic or elliptic-lanceolate, 7–12 by 2.5–5.5 cm in size. The flowers are white, purple, or pink, with purple flecks.
