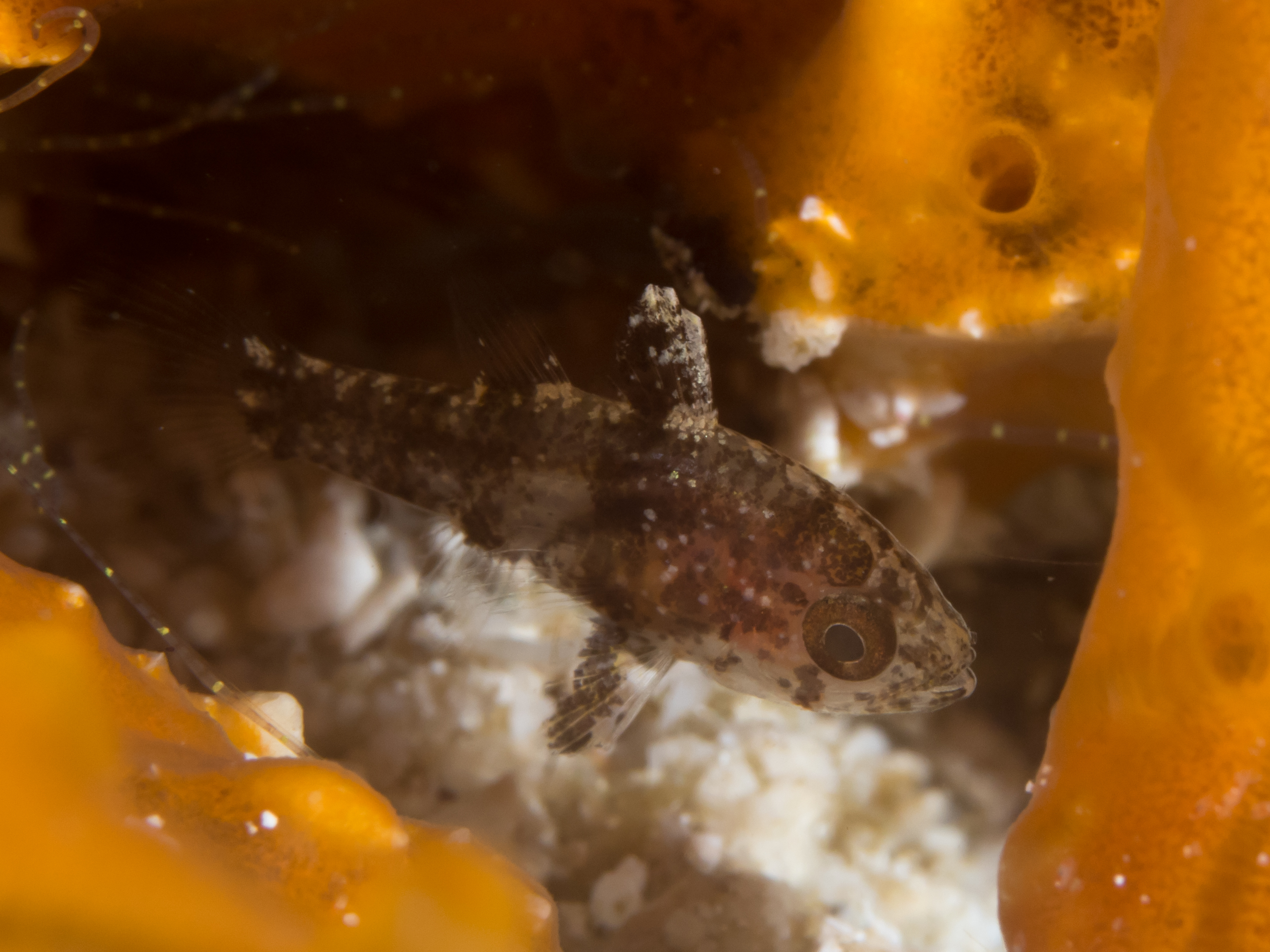

Conservation status
- Least Concern (IUCN 3.1)

Scientific classification
- Kingdom: Animalia
- Phylum: Chordata
- Class: Actinopterygii
- Division: Teleostei
- Order: Gobiiformes
- Family: Apogonidae
- Genus: Foa
- Species: F. fo

Binomial name
- Foa fo Jordan & Seale, 1905

= Foa fo =

Species of cardinalfish

Foa fo, the weedy cardinalfish, Samoan cardinalfish or Fo cardinalfish, is a species of marine ray-finned fish belonging to the family Apogonidae, the cardinalfishes. This cardinalfish is found in the Indian and Pacific Oceans.

== Taxonomy ==
Foa fo was first formally described in 1905 by the American ichthyologists David Starr Jordan and Alvin Seale with its type locality given as Cavite, Bacoor Bay, Manila Bay, Luzon, Philippines at 14.4668°N, 120.890°E. This species was described by Jordan and Seale at the same time as they described the new genus Foa, with a figure labelled Foa brachygramma (Jenkins) not Foa fo; Fowleria brachygramma is the type species of Foa not by monotypy. Subsequently, in 1905 Jordan and Barton Warren Evermann published the The aquatic resources of the Hawaiian Islands. Part I.--The shore fishes of the Hawaiian Islands, with a general account of the fish fauna with F. brachygramma described and no mention of Foa fo. The genus Foa is one of 5 genera placed in the tribe Apogonichthyini within the subfamily Apogoninae. The family Apogonidae is in the suborder Apogonoidei in the order Gobiiformes.

== Etymology ==
Foa fo is classified in the genus Foa and both the genus name and specific name are based on the fō, the Samoan name for cardinalfishes. Foa fo, with just 5 letters, is the shortest binomial for a Holocene fish species.

== Description ==
Foa fo has a short, deep body with an oval cross section and reaches a standard length of 3.5 cm (1.4 in). The first dorsal fin contains 7 spines, the second dorsal fin has a 2 spines and 9 soft rays and the anal fin has 2 spines and 8 soft rays. The weedy cardinalfish is small, with an overall colour of mottled brownish with 5 vague bars on the body, a whitish spot at the axil of the pectoral fin and another behind the base of the second dorsal fin. A further 3 whitish spots at the base of the caudal fin while the second dorsal fin, the anal fin and the caudal fin have dark bands.

== Distribution and habitat ==
Foa fo has a wide Indo-Pacific distribution. Its range extends from the eastern coast of Africa between the from the Red Sea and South Africa east through the Indian Ocean into the Pacific Ocean as far east as Rapa Iti and the Society Islands north to southern Japan and south to northern Australia. In Australia this species occurs from the North West Cape and Scott Reef in Western Australia around the northern and eastern coast to Sydney, New South Wales. The weedy cardinal fish is found at depths down to 15 m (50 ft). It is a cryptic, nocturnal cardinalfish which is found in seagrass or seaweed beds, sand-rubble areas with algae covered rock outcrops, areas of mud or silt or around isolated soft corals in sheltered coastal bays.

== See also ==
- List of short species names
