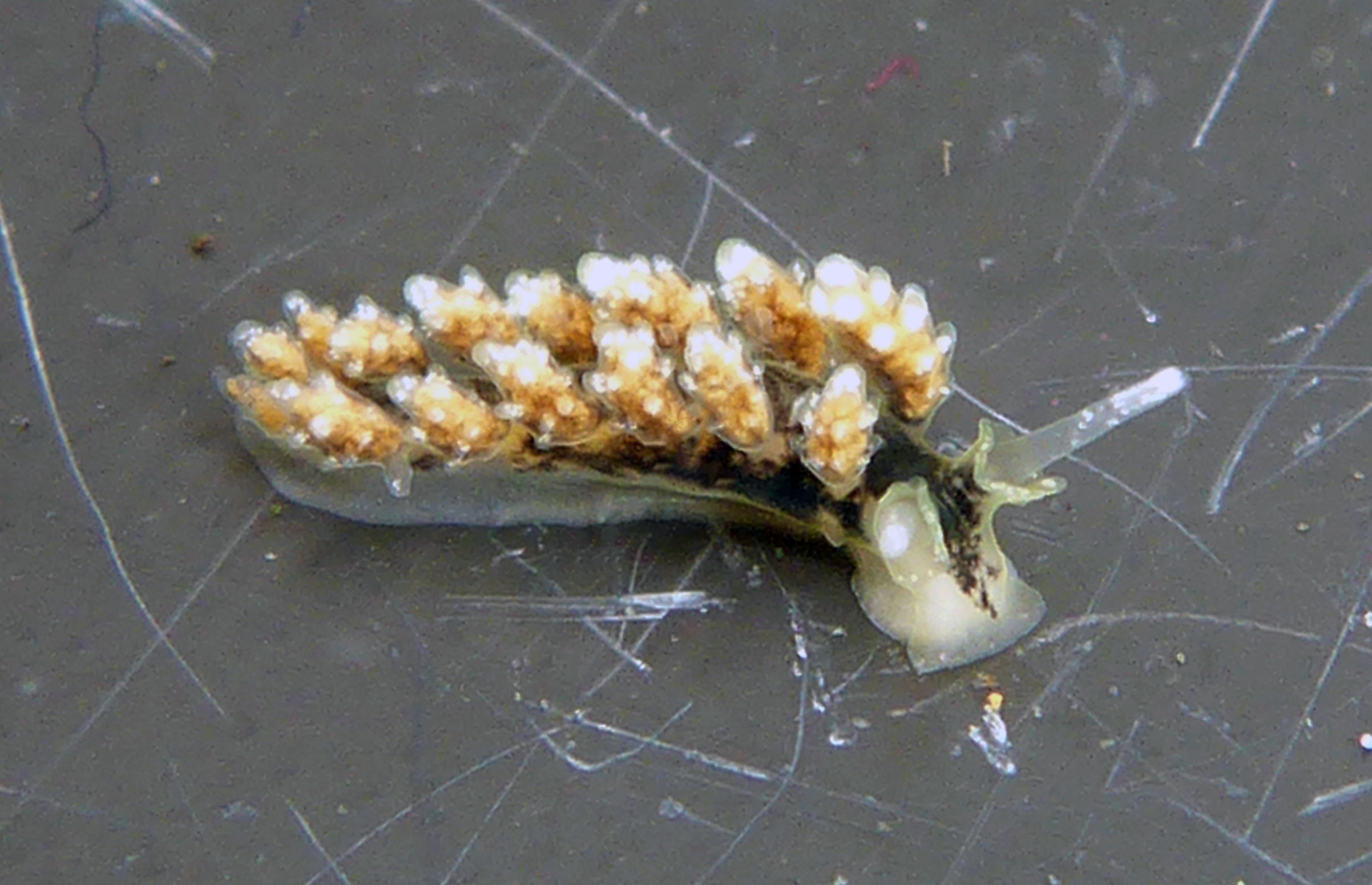
- Doto kya from Princeton Harbor, California

Scientific classification
- Kingdom: Animalia
- Phylum: Mollusca
- Class: Gastropoda
- Order: Nudibranchia
- Suborder: Dendronotacea
- Family: Dotidae
- Genus: Doto
- Species: D. kya

Binomial name
- Doto kya Marcus, 1961

= Doto kya =

Species of gastropod

Doto kya is a species of sea slug, a nudibranch, a marine gastropod mollusc in the family Dotidae.

== Distribution ==
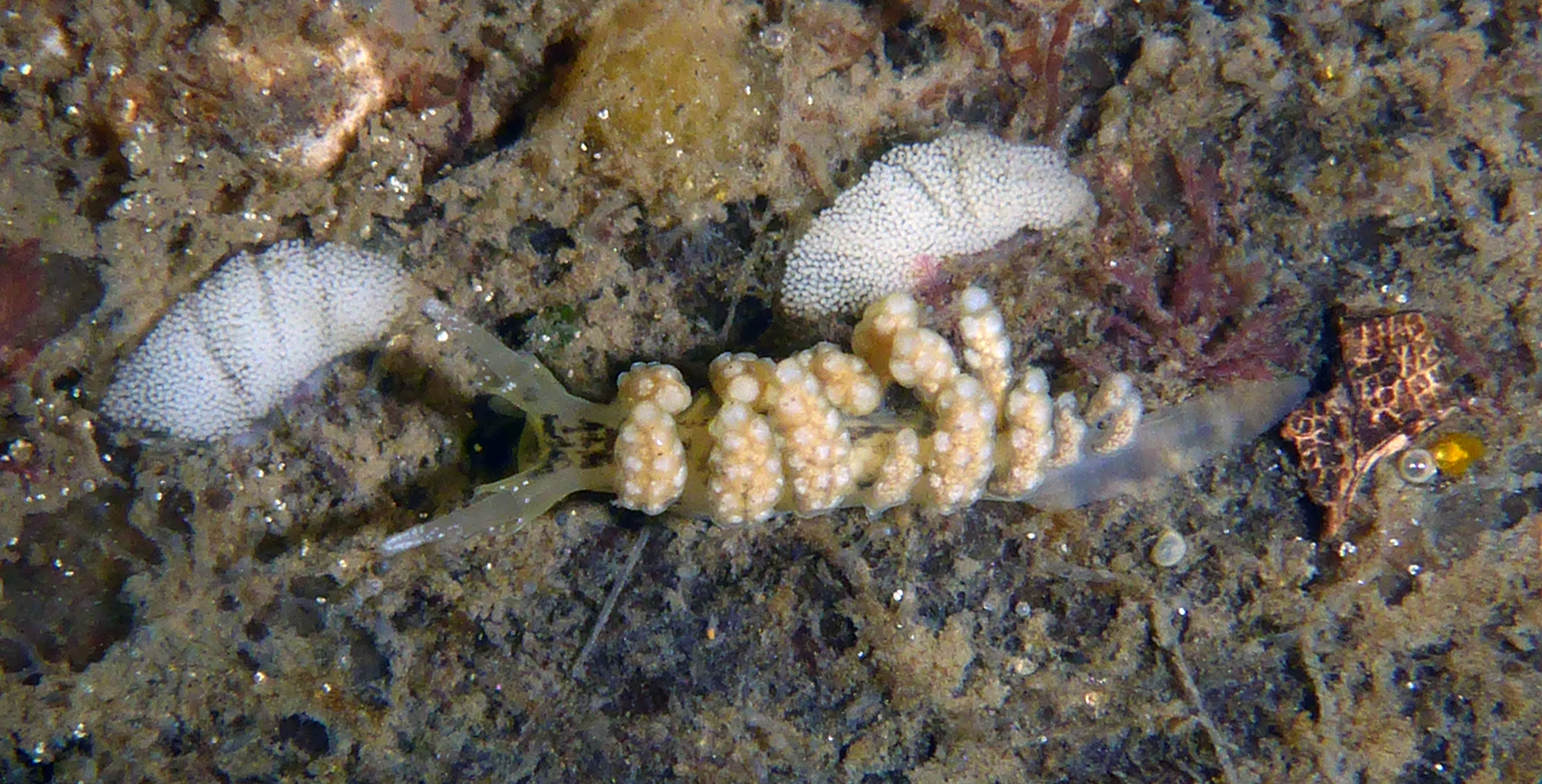
Doto kya with egg masses from Santa Cruz, California

This species was first described from California. It has been reported from the Pacific coasts of Mexico, the United States and Canada.

== Description ==
This nudibranch is white or pale brown in colour with dark brown or black markings on the body.

== Ecology ==
Doto kya feeds on hydroids.

== See also ==
- List of short species names
