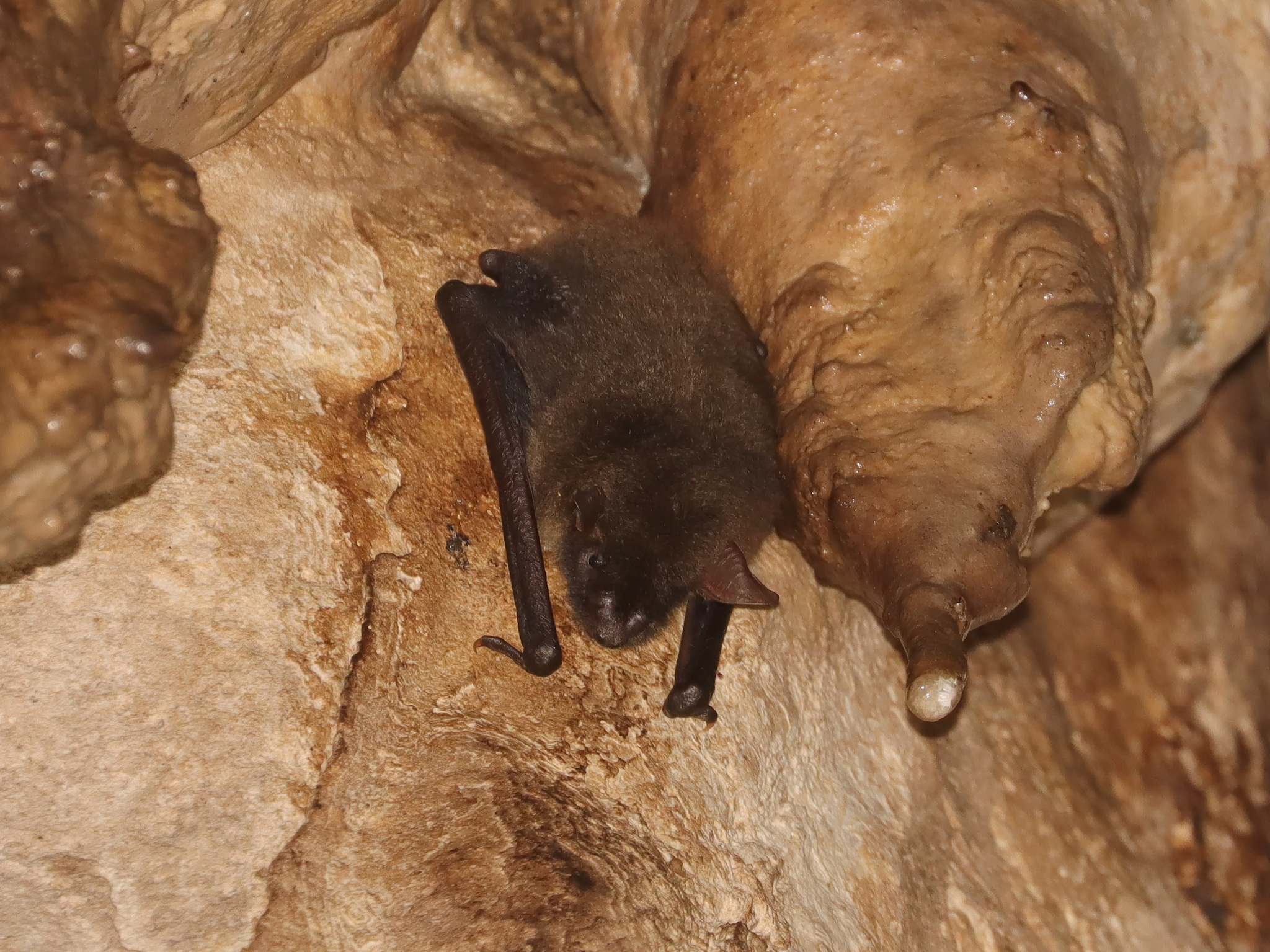

Conservation status
- Near Threatened (IUCN 3.1)

Scientific classification
- Kingdom: Animalia
- Phylum: Chordata
- Class: Mammalia
- Order: Chiroptera
- Family: Vespertilionidae
- Genus: Ia
- Species: I. io

Binomial name
- Ia io Thomas, 1902

Subspecies
- I. i. io Thomas, 1902; I. i. peninsulata Soisook et al., 2017
- Geographic range

Synonyms
- Ia longimana Pen, 1962; Parascotomanes beaulieui Bourret, 1942

= Great evening bat =

Species of bat

The great evening bat (Ia io) is the largest bat in the vesper bat family (Vespertilionidae) and the only living species in the genus Ia. It is common to Eastern and Southeastern Asia (China, India, Laos, Nepal, Thailand and Vietnam), mainly living in areas with limestone caves at altitudes of 400–1,700 m (1,300–5,600 ft). Their roost sites have been found both near the cave entrances and up to 1.5 km (0.93 mi) within the cave systems.

== Description ==
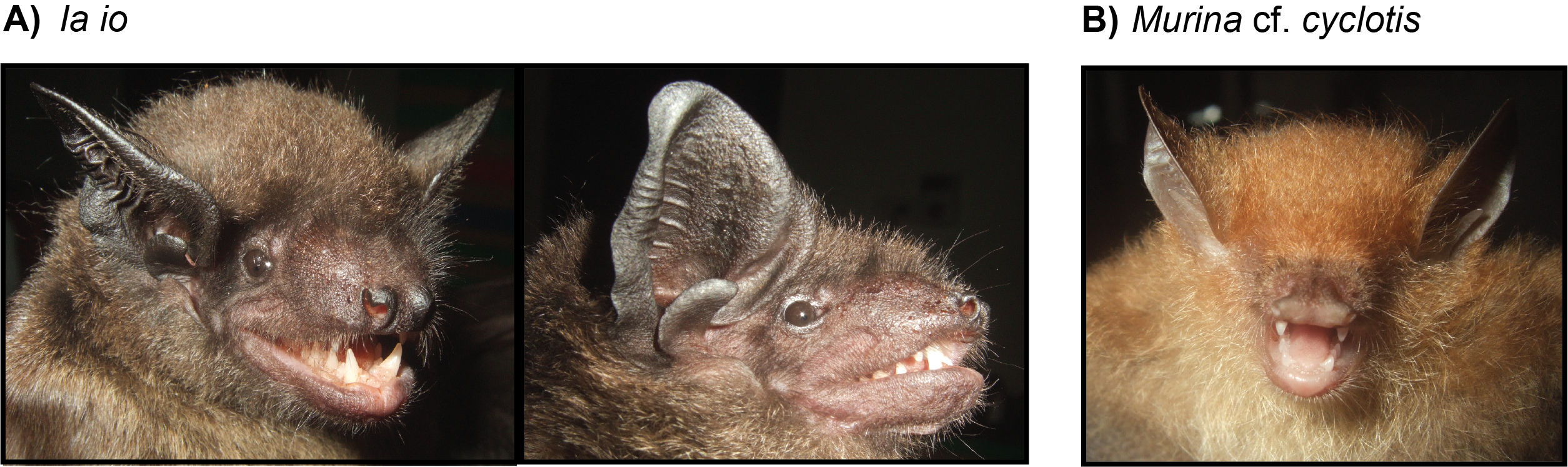
Close-up view of Ia io compared to Murina cyclotis (right).

The great evening bat reaches a length of 90–105 mm (3.5–4.1 in). It is brown on top and greyish underneath. The average wingspan is 51 cm (20 in) and it typically weighs 58 g (2.0 oz).

Not much is known about its habits and behaviour. The bat usually lives in small groups. Its food consists of insects during the summer, as with most vesper bats. The great evening bat also sometimes feeds on small birds during the autumn once insects become scarcer. The bat leaves its sleeping place in the late afternoon in search of food. During the winter months it may migrate to warmer regions.

The great evening bat's constant shifting diet makes it a suitable host for viruses. Due to the switch from insects during the summer to birds during autumn, the great evening bat is known to carry around 35 known virus families.

== Status ==
The IUCN lists its conservation status as near-threatened. One of the threats to its survival in South Asia is human influence by habitat destruction; many caves have been turned into attractions. They have also been disturbed by farmers collecting their excrement. Excessive use of insecticides also poses a threat.

== Scientific name ==
At four letters, Ia io is tied with Yi qi for the shortest existing (and shortest allowed) scientific name of any animal under the International Code of Zoological Nomenclature, and is one of very few scientific names composed solely of vowels.

The name has traditionally been associated with Io, a figure in classical mythology who was viewed as "flighty", and ia (ἰά), a Greek word signifying a shout or cry.

Griffiths suggests an alternative meaning behind Oldfield Thomas's choice of name. Instead of a reference to mythology, the name Ia io might be a joyful exclamation, translating to 'Shout hurrah!'. This interpretation posits that Thomas, who had recently become a Fellow of the Royal Society after three times previously being nominated but failing to receive the required endorsements, was expressing his elation through the naming of this species.

== See also ==
- List of short species names
