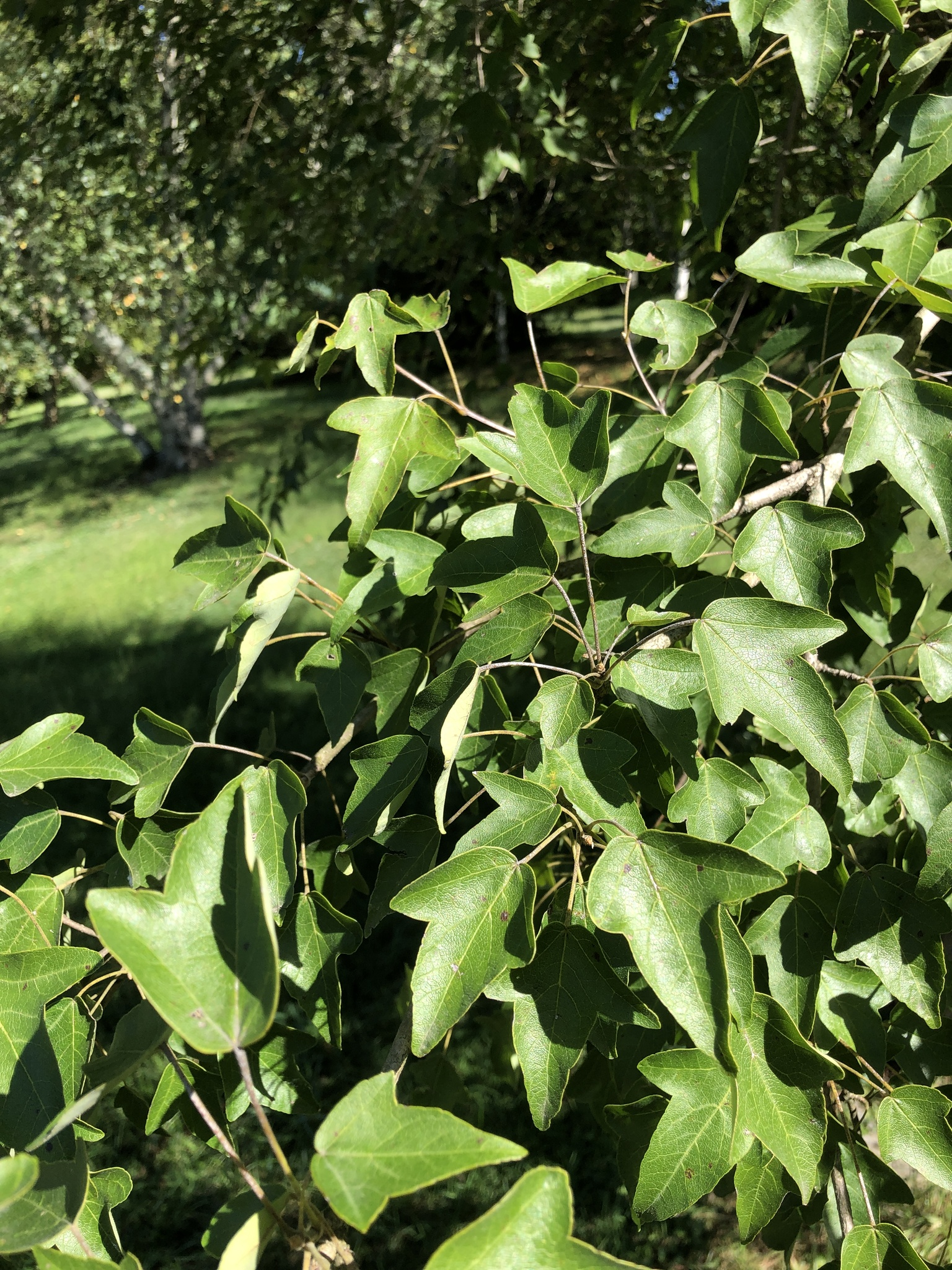
- Acer yui seen at the Morris Arboretum in Philadelphia, Pennsylvania. The seed was collected in the wild in Gansu Province in 2005

Conservation status
- Endangered (IUCN 3.1)

Scientific classification
- Kingdom: Plantae
- Clade: Tracheophytes
- Clade: Angiosperms
- Clade: Eudicots
- Clade: Rosids
- Order: Sapindales
- Family: Sapindaceae
- Genus: Acer
- Section: Acer sect. Pentaphylla
- Series: Acer ser. Trifida
- Species: A. yui

Binomial name
- Acer yui W.P.Fang 1934

Synonyms
- Acer buergerianum subsp. yui (W.P.Fang) A.E.Murray; Acer yui var. leptocarpum W.P.Fang & Y.T.Wu

= Acer yui =

Species of maple

Acer yui is an uncommon Asian species of maple. It has been found only in Gansu and Sichuan Provinces in western China.

Acer yui is a small deciduous tree up to 7 meters tall with gray bark. Leaves are non-compound, up to 7 cm wide to 2.5 cm across, thin, with 3 lobes but no teeth. It is visually similar to Acer buergerianum.
