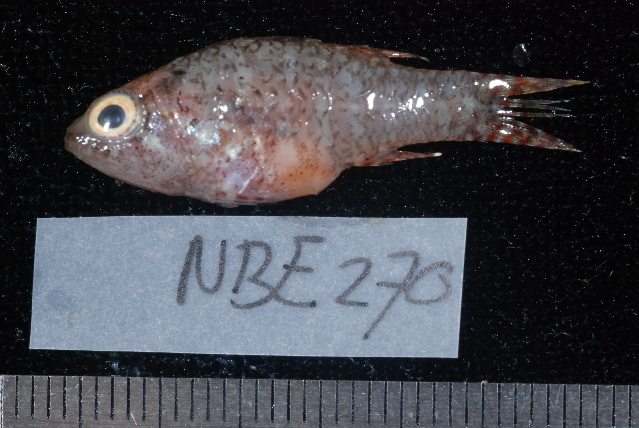
- Foa brachygramma

Scientific classification
- Kingdom: Animalia
- Phylum: Chordata
- Class: Actinopterygii
- Order: Gobiiformes
- Family: Apogonidae
- Subfamily: Apogoninae
- Genus: Foa; D. S. Jordan & Evermann, 1905

Type species
- Fowleria brachygrammus Jenkins, 1903

= Foa (fish) =

Genus of fishes

Foa is a genus of fishes in the family Apogonidae, the cardinalfishes, native to the Indian and Pacific Oceans.

== Species ==
The recognized species in this genus are:

- Foa brachygramma (O. P. Jenkins, 1903) (weed cardinalfish)
- Foa fo D. S. Jordan & Seale, 1905 (weedy cardinalfish)
- Foa hyalina (H. M. Smith & Radcliffe, 1912) (hyaline cardinalfish)
- Foa landoni (Herre, 1934)
- Foa leisi T. H. Fraser & J. E. Randall, 2011
- Foa longimana M. C. W. Weber, 1909
- Foa madagascariensis Petit, 1931
- Foa nivosa T. H. Fraser & J. E. Randall, 2011
- Foa winterbottomi T. H. Fraser, 2020
- Foa yamba T. H. Fraser, 2014 (Yamba cardinalfish)
