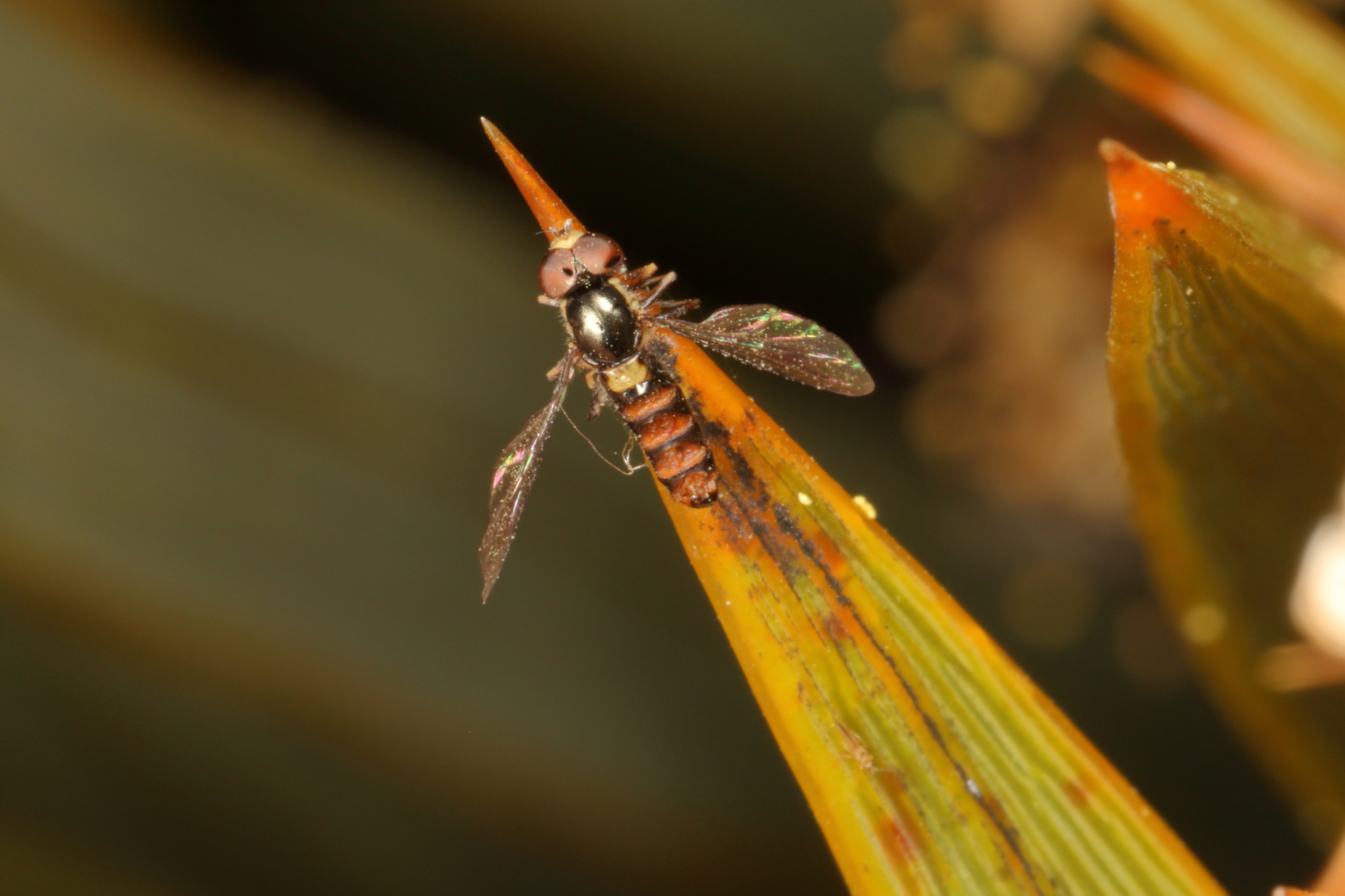

Scientific classification
- Kingdom: Animalia
- Phylum: Arthropoda
- Class: Insecta
- Order: Diptera
- Family: Syrphidae
- Tribe: Syrphini
- Genus: Anu; Thompson, 2008

Type species
- Anu una Thompson, 2008

= Anu (fly) =

Genus of flies

Anu is a genus of hoverfly, from the family Syrphidae, in the order Diptera. It is only known from New Zealand.

== Species ==
- A. una Thompson, 2008
