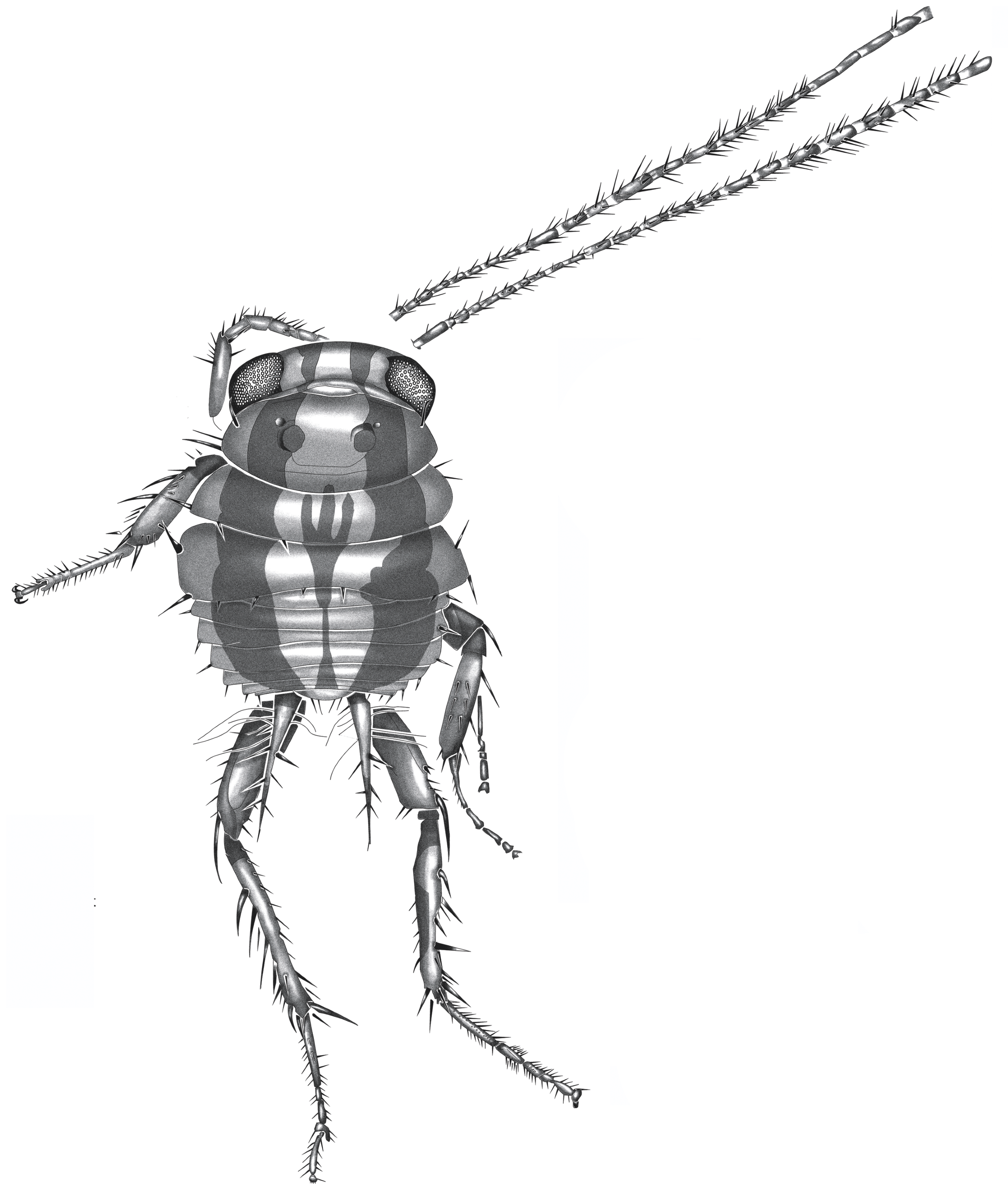
- Indeterminate blattulid nymph

Scientific classification
- Kingdom: Animalia
- Phylum: Arthropoda
- Class: Insecta
- Order: Blattodea
- Family: †Blattulidae; Vishnyakova 1982

Genera
- See text

= Blattulidae =

Blattulidae Temporal range: Ladinian–Campanian

Extinct family of cockroaches

Blattulidae is an extinct family of cockroaches known from the Triassic to the Late Cretaceous. Their distinguishing characteristics include "forewing has long Sc, regular venation with distinct intercalaries and hindwing has simple CuP, branched A1." Due to the poor ability of forewing venation to correctly classify modern cockroaches as a result of extensive homoplasy, the value of this family as a taxonomic unit has been strongly questioned, with some authors considering the family a nomen dubium.

== Systematics ==
- †Anablatta Martins-Neto and Gallego 2007 Potrerillos Formation, Argentina Ladinian
- †Argentinoblattula Martins-Neto and Gallego 2005 Los Rastros Formation, Argentina, Carnian
- †Batola Vršanský 2009 Charentese amber, France, Albian
- †Blattula Handlirsch 1906 40 species: Çakrazboz Formation, Turkey, Rhaetian Lilstock Formation, United Kingdom, Rhaetian Cattamarra Coal Measures, Australia, Toarcian Guanyintan Formation, China, Hettangian Zaoshang Formation, China, Sinemurian, Shiti Formation, Hanshan Formation China, Bajocian Jiulongshan Formation, China, Callovian, Tuodian Formation, China, Oxfordian, Posidonia Shale, "Green Series", Germany, Toarcian Karabastau Formation, Kazakhstan, Callovian Sulyukta Formation, Kyrgyzstan, Toarcian Ulaan-Ereg Formation, Sharteg, Mongolia, Tithonian Cheremkhovskaya Formation, Russia, Toarcian Itat Formation, Russia, Bajocian Uda Formation, Russia, Oxfordian Purbeck Group, United Kingdom, Berriasian, Doronino Formation, Russia, Barremian, Lushangfen Formation, Yixian Formation, China, Aptian, Jinju Formation, South Korea, Albian
- †Blattulites Vishnyakova 1982 Cheremkhovskaya Formation, Russia, Toarcian
- †Elisama Giebel 1856 Haifanggou Formation, China, Callovian/Oxfordian, Sharteg, Mongolia, Tithonian, Purbeck Group, United Kingdom, Berriasian, Crato Formation, Brazil, Aptian Dzun-Bain Formation, Mongolia, Aptian, Jinju Formation, South Korea, Albian
- †Globula Vršanský 2009 Charentese amber, France, Albian
- †Habroblattula Wang et al. 2007 Yixian Formation, Laiyang Formation, China, Aptian
- †Huablattula Qiu et al. 2019 Burmese amber, Myanmar, Cenomanian
- †Kridla Vršanský 2005 Kyndal Formation, Russia, Albian
- †Macaroblattula Wang et al. 2007 Yixian Formation, China, Aptian
- †Nula Vršanský 2008 Salignac amber, France, Cenomanian
- †Ocelloblattula Anisyutkin and Gorochov 2008 Crato Formation, Brazil, Aptian Lebanese amber, Barremian, Jinju Formation, South Korea, Albian
- †Svabula Vršanský 2005 Sharin-Gol Formation, Mongolia, Barremian
- †Vrtula Vršanský 2008 Shinekhudag Formation, Mongolia, Aptian, Jinju Formation, South Korea, Albian
- †Xonpepetla Cifuentes-Ruiz and Vršanský 2006 Cerro del Pueblo Formation, Mexico, Campanian
