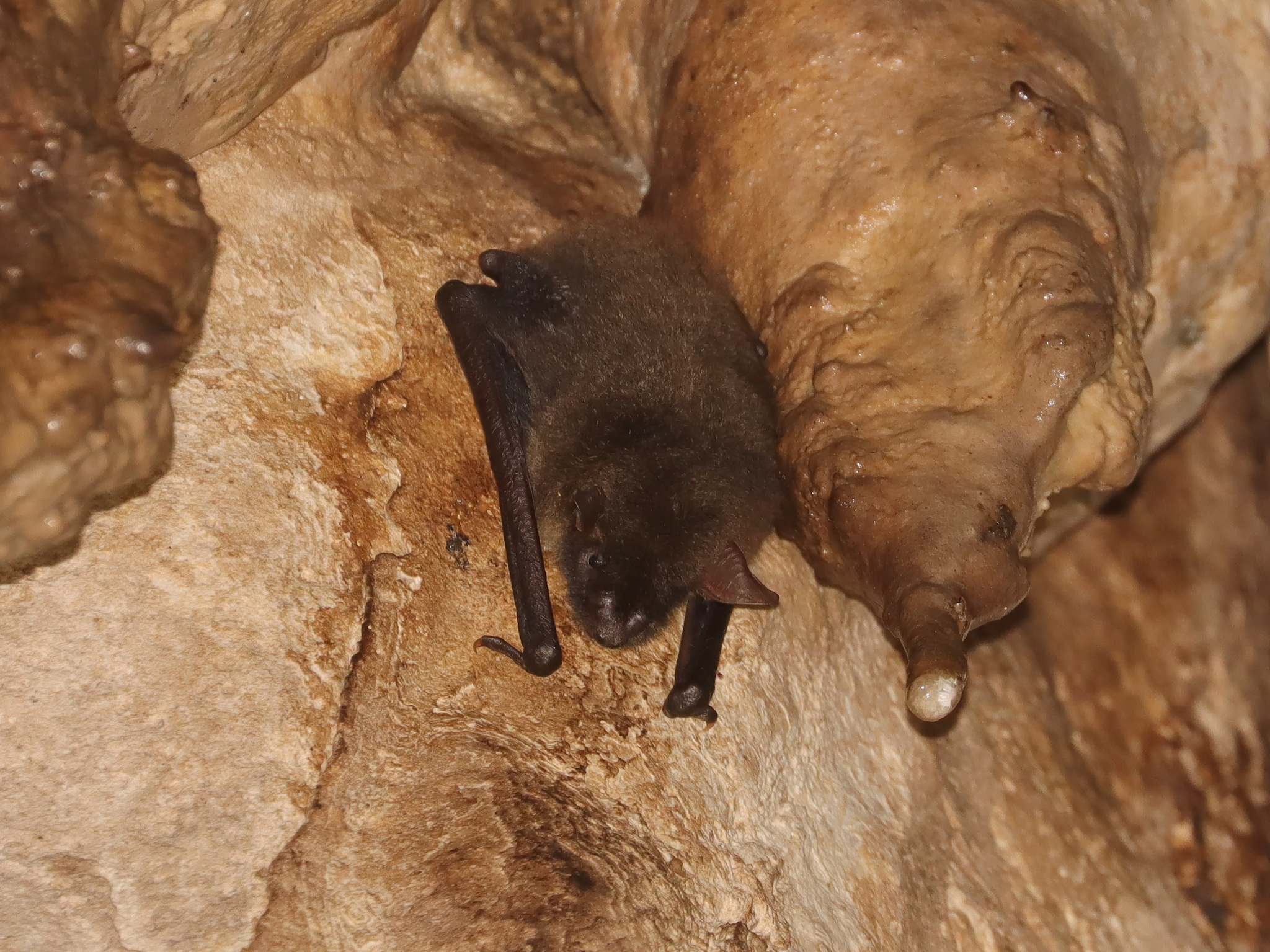
- Great evening bat (Ia io)

Scientific classification
- Kingdom: Animalia
- Phylum: Chordata
- Class: Mammalia
- Order: Chiroptera
- Family: Vespertilionidae
- Tribe: Eptesicini
- Genus: Ia; Thomas, 1902

Type species
- Ia io Thomas, 1902

Species
- †Ia lanna Mien & Ginsburg, 1997; Ia io Thomas, 1902

Synonyms
- Parascotomanes Bourret, 1942

= Ia (genus) =

Ia Temporal range: Miocene–Recent

Genus of bats

Ia is a genus of bat in the family Vespertilionidae. It belongs to the subfamily Vespertilioninae and has been placed in the tribe Vespertilionini. In the past, it has also been considered a synonym or subgenus of the genera Pipistrellus or Eptesicus, which used to contain many more species than they do now. Ia comprises a single living species, the great evening bat (I. io) of eastern and southeastern Asia, and one extinct fossil species, I. lanna, from the Miocene epoch in Thailand. Another living species, I. longimana, was recognized in the past, but it is no longer considered a valid species distinct from the great evening bat.

At two letters, Ia ties the bat-like dinosaur Yi and the butterfly Ge for the shortest possible name of any animal genus under the International Code of Zoological Nomenclature.
