= Jujiroa =

Scientific classification
- Domain: Eukaryota
- Kingdom: Animalia
- Phylum: Arthropoda
- Class: Insecta
- Order: Coleoptera
- Suborder: Adephaga
- Family: Carabidae
- Subfamily: Platyninae
- Tribe: Platynini
- Subtribe: Platynina
- Genus: Jujiroa; Ueno, 1952

Synonyms
- Yukihikous; Ja

Genus of beetles

Jujiroa is a genus of ground beetles in the family Carabidae. There are more than 30 described species in Jujiroa, found in eastern Asia.

== Species ==
These 36 species belong to the genus Jujiroa:

- Jujiroa alticola Ueno & Saito, 1991 (Taiwan and temperate Asia)
- Jujiroa ana (Ueno, 1955) (Japan)
- Jujiroa anoides Sasakawa, 2006 (Japan)
- Jujiroa clarkei Deuve, 2004 (China)
- Jujiroa dandosana Sasakawa, 2006 (Japan)
- Jujiroa deharvengi Deuve, 2004 (Vietnam)
- Jujiroa deliciola Ueno & Kishimoto, 2001 (China)
- Jujiroa dracocephala Sasakawa, 2006 (Japan)
- Jujiroa elongata Ueno, 1955 (Japan)
- Jujiroa estriata Sasakawa, 2006 (Japan)
- Jujiroa fujisana Sasakawa, 2006 (Japan)
- Jujiroa ikezakii Nakane, 1989 (Japan)
- Jujiroa imunada Ueno, 1993 (Japan)
- Jujiroa inexpectata Tian & Fang, 2020 (China)
- Jujiroa iolandae Vigna Taglianti, 1995 (China)
- Jujiroa lingguanensis Deuve & Pütz, 2013 (China)
- Jujiroa longa Ueno & Saito, 1991 (Taiwan and temperate Asia)
- Jujiroa minobusana (Habu, 1978) (Japan)
- Jujiroa montana (Morita, 2012) (Japan)
- Jujiroa nipponica (Habu, 1950) (Japan)
- Jujiroa nishikawai Ueno & Saito, 1991 (Taiwan and temperate Asia)
- Jujiroa ohkawai (Morita, 2012) (Japan)
- Jujiroa onoi Takakura, 1987 (Japan)
- Jujiroa orthogenys Ueno & Saito, 1991 (Taiwan and temperate Asia)
- Jujiroa parvicollis Ueno & Saito, 1991 (Taiwan and temperate Asia)
- Jujiroa rainerschnelli Lassalle, 2010 (Vietnam)
- Jujiroa rectangulata Ueno & Saito, 1991 (Taiwan and temperate Asia)
- Jujiroa rufescens (Jedlicka, 1961) (China)
- Jujiroa satoi Ueno, 2007 (China)
- Jujiroa shihi Ueno & Saito, 1991 (Taiwan and temperate Asia)
- Jujiroa suensoni Kirschenhofer, 1990 (China)
- Jujiroa toshioi (Habu, 1981) (Japan)
- Jujiroa troglodytes Ueno, 1955 (Japan)
- Jujiroa uenoi Tian & He, 2020 (China)
- Jujiroa wangzheni Tian & He, 2020 (China)
- Jujiroa zhouchaoi Tian & He, 2020 (China)
