= Oia (spider) =

Scientific classification
- Kingdom: Animalia
- Phylum: Arthropoda
- Subphylum: Chelicerata
- Class: Arachnida
- Order: Araneae
- Infraorder: Araneomorphae
- Family: Linyphiidae
- Genus: Oia; Wunderlich, 1973

Type species
- O. sororia Wunderlich, 1973

Species
- 4, see text

Genus of spiders

Oia is a genus of Asian dwarf spiders that was first described by J. Wunderlich in 1973.

== Species ==
As of May 2019 it contains four species:

- Oia breviprocessia Song & Li, 2010 – China
- Oia imadatei (Oi, 1964) – Russia, China, Korea, Taiwan, Japan
- Oia kathmandu Tanasevitch, 2019 – Nepal
- Oia sororia Wunderlich, 1973 (type) – India, Nepal
