= Liberiblattinidae =

Liberiblattinidae Temporal range: Toarcian–Santonian

Scientific classification
- Domain: Eukaryota
- Kingdom: Animalia
- Phylum: Arthropoda
- Class: Insecta
- Order: Blattodea
- Family: †Liberiblattinidae; Vršanský 2002

Genera
- See text

Extinct family of cockroaches

Liberiblattinidae is an extinct family of cockroaches known from the Jurassic to Cretaceous. Some taxa, like Cryptoblatta and Hydrokhoohydra, are suggested to be semiaquatic. Spongistoma is suggested to be a nectarivore due to its unique sucking/sponging "proboscis" mouthparts. Some authors have suggested that the family is ancestral to Mantodea.

== Systematics ==
Based on

- †Cryptoblatta Sendi and Azar 2019 Lebanese amber, Barremian
- †Elisamoides Vršanský 2004 Cattamarra Coal Measures, Australia, Toarcian Shar-Teg, Mongolia, Tithonian
- †Entropia Vršanský et al. 2012 Daohugou, China, Callovian
- †Gurvanoblatta Vishnyakova 1986 Gurvan-Eren Formation, Mongolia, Aptian
- †Hydrokhoohydra Vršanský 2019 Karabastau Formation, Kazakhstan, Callovian/Oxfordian
- †Kazachiblattina Vršanský 2002 Karabastau Formation, Kazakhstan, Callovian/Oxfordian
- †Kurablattina Martin 2010 Cattamarra Coal Measures, Australia, Toarcian
- †Leptolythica Vršanský 2009, Charentese amber, France, Albian
- †Liberiblattina Vršanský 2002 Karabastau Formation, Kazakhstan, Callovian/Oxfordian
- †Spongistoma Sendi 2020 Burmese amber, Myanmar, Cenomanian
- †Stavba Vršanská and Vršanský 2019 Burmese amber, Myanmar, Cenomanian

Indeterminate juveniles are also known from the Aptian Crato Formation of Brazil, the Aalenian Bakhar Formation of Mongolia, and the Santonian Taimyr amber of Russia.
