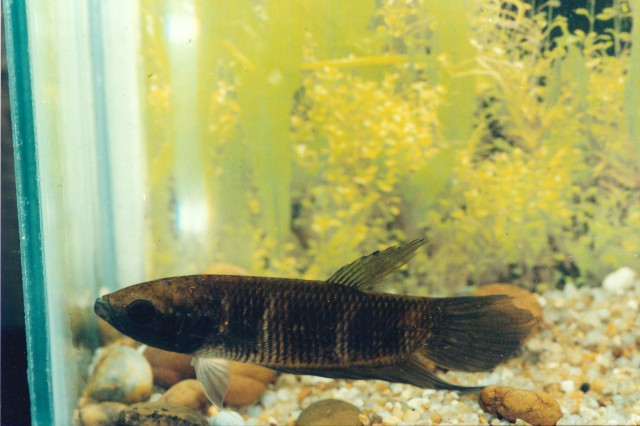

Conservation status
- Endangered (IUCN 3.1)

Scientific classification
- Kingdom: Animalia
- Phylum: Chordata
- Class: Actinopterygii
- Order: Anabantiformes
- Family: Osphronemidae
- Genus: Betta
- Species: B. pi

Binomial name
- Betta pi H. H. Tan, 1998

= Betta pi =

Species of fish

Betta pi is a species of gourami belonging to the genus Betta. It is found in the Pru Toe-Daeng peat swamps in Narathiwat Province in Southern Thailand, but its range also extends into northern Peninsular Malaysia, most notably the states of Kelantan and Terengganu. It is primarily found in well-shaded peat forest blackwater swamps and creeks where the pH can be as low as 3.0 or 4.0. It is benthopelagic. It can grow to a maximum length of 9.0 cm (3.5 in). It is a fish of mild importance in the aquarium industry. Its diet consists of aquatic invertebrates in the wild, but will also eat frozen, live and dried foods such as larva of Chironomidae (also known as bloodworms), Daphnia, and brine shrimp in aquariums.

== Anatomy and behavior ==
=== Anatomy ===
Betta pi has a body, coloration, and anatomy typical of the B.wasseri complex of closely related fish. It is mostly clay yellow, with iridescent gold scales in adult males, and black throat markings, which in Betta pi resemble the Greek letter pi, hence the specific name. It is also, like all fish of the Betta genus, a facultative air-breathing fish, because of its labyrinth organ.

=== Behavior ===
Betta pi is a relatively less aggressive fish than most of the others in the genus Betta. However, it is still not recommended that it is put in a community aquarium (mostly because of maintenance requirements).

== Sexual dimorphism ==
Betta pi displays mild sexual dimorphism, with males growing larger, developing more extended fins, and also having a broader head than females.

== Reproduction and development ==
Being a mouthbrooder, Betta pi has a breeding process which is very typical of mouthbrooding fish of the Betta genus. Following a protracted courtship, eggs and milt are released during a stage where the male is wrapped around the female. This is typical of gouramis. The male might have to wrap around the female several times before spawning happens. Then, fertilised eggs are caught on the anal fin of the male, then picked up in the mouth of the female before being spat out into the water for the male to catch. Once the male has all the eggs in his mouth the process is repeated until the female is spent of eggs, a process which can take some time.A brooding male may swallow or release the eggs prematurely if stressed or inexperienced. The incubation period is usually 10-28 days, after which the male will begin to release free-swimming fry. The adults tend not to eat the fry, and some breeders have reported them to develop at a faster rate when left with the parents. The fry are large enough to accept foods such as microworm and brine shrimp immediately, though there exist reports of young Betta developing health issues if it eats excessive amounts of the latter. In the aquarium, water changes should be small and regular rather than large and intermittent.

As a result of the males' mouthbrooding capabilities, Betta pi exhibits male-only parental behavior. After the female releases the eggs, she does not play a role in caring for the offspring. Rather, the male guards the eggs until they have developed.

== In the aquarium ==
Betta pi is of mild importance in the aquarium trade. It is not recommended that it be housed into a community aquarium, not because of its aggressive nature typical of gouramis, but because of its very specific requirements. The water conditions recommendable for Betta pi include 4.0-6.5 in pH, and 18-90 ppm in GH. It requires acidic water, negligible carbonate hardness and very soft water. It should be maintained in a fully decorated aquarium, and driftwood roots and driftwood branches should be arranged so that there is some degree of shade added, while clay pots and tubes can be added as hiding spots and shelter. Adding dried leaf litter as a substrate can add even more cover and also starts a microbial colony, and tannins present in the leaves are beneficial for Betta pi, as it is a fish from blackwater environments. Betta pi, like other fish of its genus, thrive with dim lighting. Plants that withstand the conditions required by Betta pi include Microsorum, Taxiphyllum, and Cryptocoryne. Floating plants are a beneficial addition to the tank as well. The filter should be a low-flow filter, as Betta pi is an inhabitant of sluggish water.

== Threats ==
Betta pi is threatened with mostly habitat destruction by human activity, with large tracts of forest being cleared for the rubber and palm oil industries.
