= Nula sis =

Nula sis Temporal range: Cenomanian

Scientific classification
- Kingdom: Animalia
- Phylum: Arthropoda
- Class: Insecta
- Order: Blattodea
- Family: †Blattulidae
- Genus: †Nula; Vršanský, 2008
- Species: †N. sis

Binomial name
- †Nula sis Vršanský, 2008

Extinct species of cockroach

Nula is an extinct genus of Blattaria (cockroach) from the Sisteron amber deposits near Salignac in Alpes de Haute Provence, southeastern France. It lived during the early Cenomanian. It belongs to the extinct family Blattulidae and contains one species: Nula sis.

== Discovery and naming ==
The amber containing this fossil and other arthropods was found in blue marls from the middle Cretaceous of southeastern France, more specifically near the Salignac commune. The holotype, and only specimen, SIS-17.2. is an immature male nympha. It was named after "nula", meaning zero in Latin because of the specimen not being fully grown and "sis" meaning "if you like it" in Latin. The specific name is also a shortened version of Sisteron.

== Description ==
Nula has a large head with big compound eyes. The head also carries three small ocelli probably used for light detection. The antennae are long and composed of at least 44 segments. The pronotum, mesonotum and metanotum, which are sclerites of the thorax, carry numerous strong setae. The legs are made for running: the coxa is short compared to the long femur, which favors mobility. Setae are also present on the tarsus.

== Ecology ==
Other organisms such as an hemipteran, a coleopteran and a bristle millipede (Polyxenida) were also found in the Salignac amber and might have cohexisted with Nula.
