= Wen-Pei Fang =

Chinese botanist (1899–1983)

Fang Wen-Pei (方文培) (1899–1983), was a Chinese botanist, an expert on rhododendrons and on the Maple Family. He worked in the Institute of Botany, at the Chinese Academy of Sciences after graduating from Southeast University in Nanjing, China. Fang furthered his study at the University of Edinburgh in 1934 and received his PhD in 1937. In the same year, he returned to China and became a biology professor at Sichuan University until his death.

In his lifelong research, he identified more than 100 new species of plants in which he named more than 40, publishing 8 monographs and over 50 papers. He was honored as "one of the most distinguished Chinese botanists".
