= A. aurantiaca =

A. aurantiaca may refer to:

- Annona aurantiaca, species of plant in the family Annonaceae
- Aurantilaria aurantiaca, species of sea snail
- Asura aurantiaca, species of moth of the family Erebidae
- Arsenicitalea aurantiaca, arsenic-resistant bacteria from the family of Devosiaceae
- Arcicella aurantiaca, Gram-negative, strictly aerobic, vibrioid and non-motile bacterium
- Asthena aurantiaca, moth in the family Geometridae
- Aa aurantiaca, species of orchid in the genus Aa native to Peru
- Stereum hirsutum, fungus typically forming multiple brackets on dead wood (synonym Auricularia aurantiaca)
- Alstroemeria aurea, species of flowering plant in the family Alstroemeriaceae (synonym Alstroemeria aurantiaca)
- Stylissa carteri, species of sponge (synonym Acanthella aurantiaca)
- Brassia aurantiaca, species of orchid native to Colombia, Ecuador and Venezuela (synonym Ada aurantiaca)
- Arnica rydbergii, North American species of flowering plant in the family Asteraceae (synonym Arnica aurantiaca)
- Achyra massalis, moth of the family Crambidae (synonym Anerastia aurantiaca)
