= T. indica =

T. indica may refer to:

- Tamarindus indica, the imli or tamarind, a tree species
- Tarucus indica, the Indian Pierrot, a small butterfly species found in India of the lycaenids or blues family
- Tatera indica, the Indian gerbil, a rodent species found in Afghanistan, India, Iran, Iraq and Kuwait
- Tecticornia indica, a species of succulent plant in the amaranth family
- Tilakiella indica, the single species in the monotypic genus Tilakiella
- Tilletia indica, the Karnal bunt, a smut fungus species
- Tinissa indica, a species of fungus moth
- Treatia indica, a species of mite
- Tricolia indica, a species of pheasant snail
- Tringa indica, the red-wattled lapwing, a bird species
- Trypeta indica, a fruit fly species

== Synonyms ==
- Tabernaemontana indica, a synonym of Tabernaemontana pandacaqui, the windmill bush
- Tyrosinophaga indica, a synonym of Emticicia oligotrophica, a species of bacterium found in warm spring water

== See also ==
- Indica (disambiguation)
