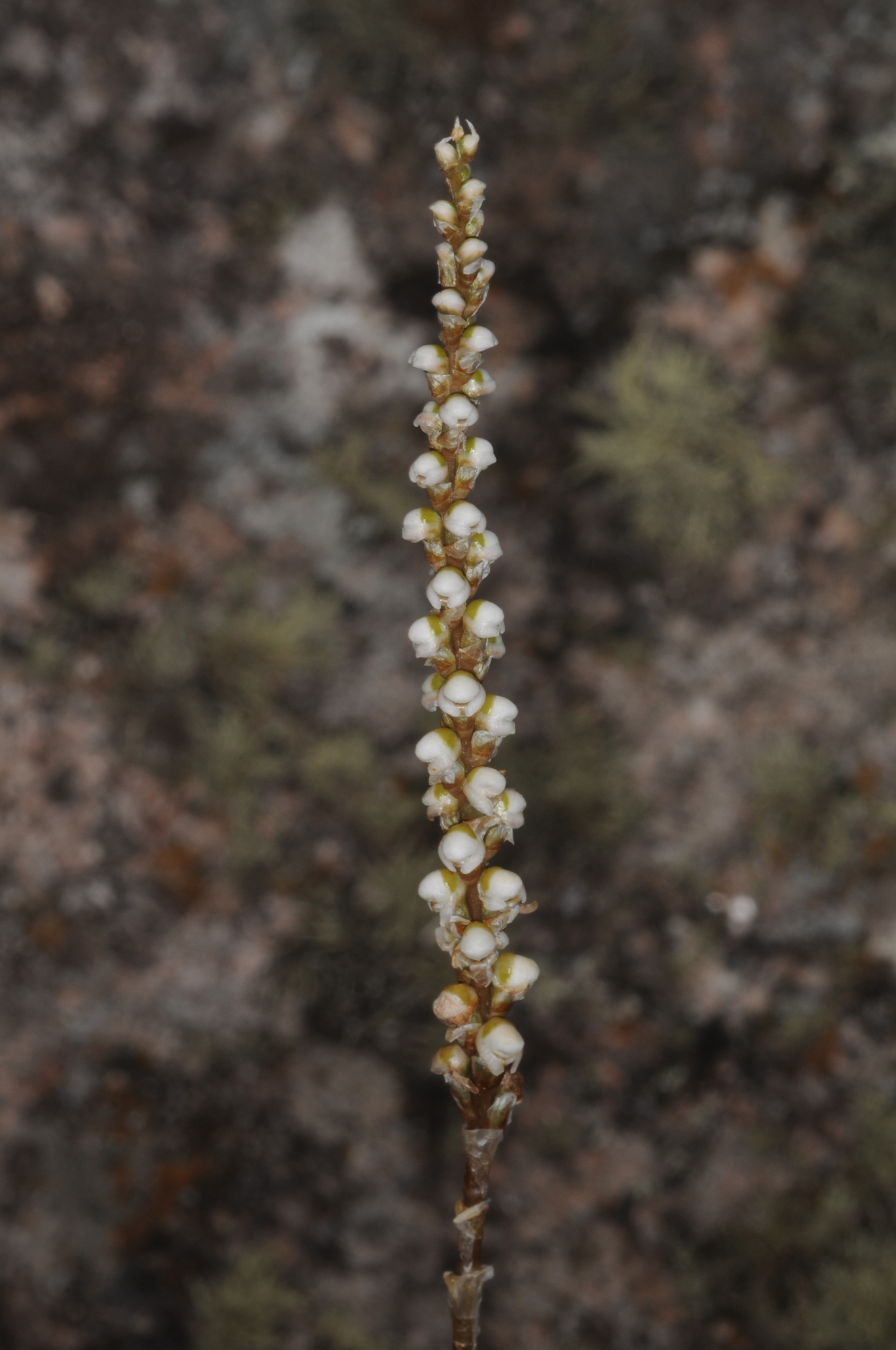
- Aa achalensis

Scientific classification
- Kingdom: Plantae
- Clade: Embryophytes
- Clade: Tracheophytes
- Clade: Spermatophytes
- Clade: Angiosperms
- Clade: Monocots
- Order: Asparagales
- Family: Orchidaceae
- Subfamily: Orchidoideae
- Tribe: Cranichideae
- Subtribe: Cranichidinae
- Genus: Aa; Rchb.f., 1854

Species
- See text

= Aa (plant) =

Genus of flowering plants

Aa is a genus of plants of the family Orchidaceae.

Species in this genus can be found growing terrestrially in cold habitats near the snowline in the Andes and also in Costa Rica; they are usually found close to small streams. The elongated inflorescence grows from a basal rosette of leaves, terminating in a small white non-resupinate flower. This lip is fringed and hood-shaped. The flower gives off a pungent smell that attracts flies. This genus has often been included in the orchid genus Altensteinia.

The first scientific description of a species of this genus was made in 1815 by Karl Sigismund Kunth, naming it first Ophrys paleacea Kunth (1806)., and later Altensteinia paleacea. In 1854 Heinrich Gustav Reichenbach separated Aa from Altensteinia, to include two species Aa argyrolepis and Aa paleacea. The genus name apparently was rendered by the author to always appear first in alphabetical listings. Another – disputed – explanation, is that Reichenbach named this genus after Pieter van der Aa; the printer of the Dutch botanist Paul Herman's "Paradisus Batavus". A few years later, Reichenbach reviewed the name of the genus and named it again Altensteinia. Finally in 1912 Rudolf Schlechter switched the name again to Aa, as more species were being discovered making the new name more significant.

== Species ==
The following species of Aa are accepted

- Aa achalensis Schltr. 1920 (Argentina)
- Aa argyrolepis Rchb.f. 1854 (Colombia to Ecuador)
- Aa aurantiaca D.Trujillo (Peru)
- Aa calceata (Rchb.f.) Schltr. 1912 (Peru to Bolivia)
- Aa colombiana Schltr. 1920 (Colombia to Ecuador)
- Aa denticulata Schltr. 1920 (Colombia to Ecuador)
- Aa erosa (Rchb.f.) Schltr. 1912 (Peru)
- Aa fiebrigii (Schltr.) Schltr. 1912 (Bolivia)
- Aa figueroae Szlach. & S. Nowak, 2014 (Colombia)
- Aa hieronymi (Cogn.) Schltr. 1912 (Argentina)
- Aa lehmannii Rchb. f. ex Szlach. & Kolan., 2014 (Ecuador)
- Aa leucantha (Rchb.f.) Schltr. 1920 (Colombia to Ecuador)
- Aa lorentzii Schltr. 1920 (Argentina)
- Aa lozanoi Szlach. & S. Nowak, 2014 (Colombia)
- Aa macra Schltr. 1921 (Ecuador)
- Aa maderoi Schltr. 1920 (Venezuela; Colombia; Ecuador)
- Aa mandonii (Rchb.f.) Schltr. 1912 (Peru to Bolivia)
- Aa matthewsii (Rchb.f.) Schltr. 1912 (Peru)
- Aa microtidis Schltr. 1922 (Bolivia)
- Aa paleacea (Kunth) Rchb.f. 1854 (Costa Rica to Bolivia)
- Aa riobambae Schltr. 1921 (Ecuador)
- Aa rosei Ames 1922 (Peru)
- Aa schickendanzii Schltr. 1920 (Argentina)
- Aa sphaeroglossa Schltr. 1922 (Bolivia)
- Aa trilobulata Schltr. 1922 (Bolivia)
- Aa weddelliana (Rchb.f.) Schltr. 1912 (Peru to NW Argentina)

Synonyms:

- Aa hartwegii Garay 1978 (Ecuador; Colombia; Venezuela); syn., → Aa maderoi Schltr.,
- Aa gymnandra (Rchb.f.) Schltr. 1912 a synonym of Myrosmodes gymnandra (Rchb.f.) C.A.Vargas
- Aa inaequalis (Rchb.f.) Schltr. 1912 (Peru to Bolivia); a synonym of Myrosmodes inaequalis (Rchb.f.) C.A.Vargas
- Aa nervosa (Kraenzl.) Schltr. 1912 (Chile); accepted name Myrosmodes nervosa (Kraenzl.) Novoa, C.A.Vargas & Cisternas
