= Aa sphaeroglossa =

Scientific classification
- Kingdom: Plantae
- Clade: Tracheophytes
- Clade: Angiosperms
- Clade: Monocots
- Order: Asparagales
- Family: Orchidaceae
- Subfamily: Orchidoideae
- Tribe: Cranichideae
- Genus: Aa
- Species: A. sphaeroglossa

Binomial name
- Aa sphaeroglossa Schltr., 1922

Species of orchid

Aa sphaeroglossa is a species of orchid in the genus Aa. It is endemic to Bolivia, where it grows at altitudes of 3,300 to 3,800 metres (10,827 to 12,467 feet).

== Taxonomy ==
Aa sphaeroglossa was described in 1922 by German botanist Friedrich R.F. Schlechter, based on a specimen collected by Karl Fiebrig. Its species name, sphaeroglossa, comes from Ancient Greek sphaîra, “sphere” and glôssă, “tongue”. It was noted to be similar to Aa microtidis and Aa mandonii, apparently having larger flowers than A. microtidis and being distinguishable from A. mandonii by the shape of the flower's lip and column.

== Description ==
It is a terrestrial plant with an erect, slender growth habit, growing 12 to 20 centimetres tall. The roots are fleshy, cylindrical and smooth. It is a tuberous geophyte. A. sphaeroglossa has a few lanceolate leaves at the base of the plant, which are up to 2 centimetres long and held upright. The raceme is rigid and narrow, growing 2.5 to 5 centimetres tall with several closely clustered flowers which emerge from narrowly tapered, glossy sheathes 2.5 to 3 millimetres in diameter and are borne on glossy, angular floral bracts. The flowers are shorter than the bracts.

The flower's labellum (central bottom petal) is spherical and smooth. Lower lateral sepals are semi-circular with jagged edges and twice as large as the similarly shaped upper lateral sepals. The intermediate lobe is semi-circular, with fringed edges. The flower's opening has five curved lobes. The ovaries are egg-shaped, smooth, 2.5 millimetres long, and sessile (attaches directly to the stalk, with no pedicel), the column is short and thick, and the rostellum is broad and notched in the middle.

== Distribution and habitat ==
Aa sphaeroglossa occurs on rocky slopes in the central valleys of the Tarija department in southern Bolivia, at elevations of 3,300 to 3,800 metres (10,827 to 12,467 feet). The type specimen was recorded from Puna Patanca at 3,550 metres (11,646 feet), about 38 kilometres (24 miles) from the city of Tarija, Bolivia. No other specimens are known to have been collected.
