= Larkinella knui =

Scientific classification
- Domain: Bacteria
- Kingdom: Pseudomonadati
- Phylum: Bacteroidota
- Class: Cytophagia
- Order: Cytophagales
- Family: Spirosomataceae
- Genus: Larkinella
- Species: L. knui

Binomial name
- Larkinella knui Jeon et al. 2018

Type strain
- JCM 31989, KCTC 42998, strain 15J6-3T6

Species of bacterium

Larkinella knui is a Gram-negative, aerobic and motile bacterium from the genus Larkinella which has been isolated from soil from the Jeju Island in Korea.
