= A. colombiana =

A. colombiana may refer to:

- Aa colombiana, species of orchid in the genus Aa
- Aechmea colombiana, a bromeliad native to Ecuador
- Alvania colombiana, a marine sea snail in the family Rissoidae

== See also ==
- Colombiana (disambiguation)
