= Dyadobacter hamtensis =

Scientific classification
- Domain: Bacteria
- Kingdom: Pseudomonadati
- Phylum: Bacteroidota
- Class: Cytophagia
- Order: Cytophagales
- Family: Spirosomataceae
- Genus: Dyadobacter
- Species: D. hamtensis

Binomial name
- Dyadobacter hamtensis Chaturvedi et al. 2005

Type strain
- JCM 12919, MTCC 7023, HHS 11

Synonyms
- Dyadobacter himalayensis

Species of bacterium

Dyadobacter hamtensis is a bacterium from the genus Dyadobacter which has been isolated from the Hamta glacier in the Himalayas in India.
