= Larkinella bovis =

Scientific classification
- Domain: Bacteria
- Kingdom: Pseudomonadati
- Phylum: Bacteroidota
- Class: Cytophagia
- Order: Cytophagales
- Family: Spirosomataceae
- Genus: Larkinella
- Species: L. bovis

Binomial name
- Larkinella bovis Anandham et al. 2011

Type strain
- KACC 14040, M2T2B15, NBRC 106324

Species of bacterium

Larkinella bovis is a Gram-negative and strictly aerobic bacterium from the genus Larkinella which has been isolated from fermented bovine products.
