= Dyadobacter endophyticus =

Scientific classification
- Domain: Bacteria
- Kingdom: Pseudomonadati
- Phylum: Bacteroidota
- Class: Cytophagia
- Order: Cytophagales
- Family: Spirosomataceae
- Genus: Dyadobacter
- Species: D. endophyticus

Binomial name
- Dyadobacter endophyticus Gao et al. 2016

Type strain
- CGMCC 1.15288, DSM 100786, strain 65

Species of bacterium

Dyadobacter endophyticus is an endophytic, aerobic and rod-shaped bacterium from the genus Dyadobacter which has been isolated from a maize root from Beijing in China.
