= Dyadobacter fermentans =

Scientific classification
- Domain: Bacteria
- Kingdom: Pseudomonadati
- Phylum: Bacteroidota
- Class: Cytophagia
- Order: Cytophagales
- Family: Spirosomataceae
- Genus: Dyadobacter
- Species: D. fermentans

Binomial name
- Dyadobacter fermentans Chelius and Triplett 2000

Type strain
- ATCC 700827, CIP 107007, DSM 18053, NCIMB 13785, NS114

Synonyms
- Dyadobacter fermentens

Species of bacterium

Dyadobacter fermentans is a Gram-negative bacterium from the genus Dyadobacter which has been isolated from the stem of a Zea mays plant.
