= Dyadobacter koreensis =

Scientific classification
- Domain: Bacteria
- Kingdom: Pseudomonadati
- Phylum: Bacteroidota
- Class: Cytophagia
- Order: Cytophagales
- Family: Spirosomataceae
- Genus: Dyadobacter
- Species: D. koreensis

Binomial name
- Dyadobacter koreensis Baik et al. 2007

Type strain
- DSM 19938, WPCB159, KCTC 12537, NBRC 101116

Species of bacterium

Dyadobacter koreensis is a Gram-negative, aerobic, rod-shaped and non-motile bacterium from the genus Dyadobacter which has been isolated from fresh water from the Woopo wetland in Korea.
