= Larkinella insperata =

Scientific classification
- Domain: Bacteria
- Kingdom: Pseudomonadati
- Phylum: Bacteroidota
- Class: Cytophagia
- Order: Cytophagales
- Family: Spirosomataceae
- Genus: Larkinella
- Species: L. insperata

Binomial name
- Larkinella insperata Vancanneyt et al. 2006

Type strain
- LMG 22510, NCIMB 14103

Species of bacterium

Larkinella insperata is a Gram-negative bacterium from the genus Larkinella.
