= Dyadobacter tibetensis =

Scientific classification
- Domain: Bacteria
- Kingdom: Pseudomonadati
- Phylum: Bacteroidota
- Class: Cytophagia
- Order: Cytophagales
- Family: Spirosomataceae
- Genus: Dyadobacter
- Species: D. tibetensis

Binomial name
- Dyadobacter tibetensis Shen et al. 2013

Type strain
- CGMCC 1.12215, JCM 18589, Y620-1

Species of bacterium

Dyadobacter tibetensis is a Gram-negative, aerobic, rod-shaped and non-motile bacterium from the genus Dyadobacter which has been isolated from a glacial ice core from the Tibetan Plateau in China.
