= Emticicia ginsengisoli =

Scientific classification
- Domain: Bacteria
- Kingdom: Pseudomonadati
- Phylum: Bacteroidota
- Class: Cytophagia
- Order: Cytophagales
- Family: Spirosomataceae
- Genus: Emticicia
- Species: E. ginsengisoli

Binomial name
- Emticicia ginsengisoli Liu et al. 2008

Type strain
- Gsoil 085, KCTC 12588, LMG 23396

Synonyms
- Kaistomonas ginsengisoli

Species of bacterium

Emticicia ginsengisoli is a Gram-negative, strictly aerobic, rod-shaped and non-motile bacterium from the genus Emticicia which has been isolated from soil from a ginseng field in Pocheon in Korea.
