= A. fiebrigii =

A. fiebrigii may refer to:

- Aa fiebrigii, species of orchid
- Aloysia fiebrigii, species of flowering plants
- Aylostera fiebrigii, species of cactus
