= A. erosa =

A. erosa may refer to:

- Aa erosa, species of orchid
- Anomis erosa, moth of the family Erebidae
- Asclepias erosa, species of milkweed
