= Dyadobacter jejuensis =

Scientific classification
- Domain: Bacteria
- Kingdom: Pseudomonadati
- Phylum: Bacteroidota
- Class: Cytophagia
- Order: Cytophagales
- Family: Spirosomataceae
- Genus: Dyadobacter
- Species: D. jejuensis

Binomial name
- Dyadobacter jejuensis Chun et al. 2013

Type strain
- AM1R11, JCM 17918, KACC 16446

Species of bacterium

Dyadobacter jejuensis is a bacterium from the genus Dyadobacter which has been isolated from seawater from the Jeju Island from Korea.
