= Dyadobacter arcticus =

Scientific classification
- Domain: Bacteria
- Kingdom: Pseudomonadati
- Phylum: Bacteroidota
- Class: Cytophagia
- Order: Cytophagales
- Family: Spirosomataceae
- Genus: Dyadobacter
- Species: D. arcticus

Binomial name
- Dyadobacter arcticus Chen et al. 2013

Type strain
- CCTCC AB 2011022, R-S7-29, NRRL B-59659

Species of bacterium

Dyadobacter arcticus is a Gram-negative, psychrotolerant, rod-shaped, aerobic and non-motile bacterium from the genus Dyadobacter which has been isolated from Arctic soil from Svalbard Archipelago in Norway.
