= Emticicia sediminis =

Scientific classification
- Domain: Bacteria
- Kingdom: Pseudomonadati
- Phylum: Bacteroidota
- Class: Cytophagia
- Order: Cytophagales
- Family: Spirosomataceae
- Genus: Emticicia
- Species: E. sediminis

Binomial name
- Emticicia sediminis Park et al. 2015

Type strain
- KACC 17466, JCM 19321, KACC 17466, JBR12

Species of bacterium

Emticicia sediminis is a bacterium from the genus Emticicia which has been isolated from sedimenta from a shallow stream in Cheonan in Korea.
