= Dyadobacter sediminis =

Scientific classification
- Domain: Bacteria
- Kingdom: Pseudomonadati
- Phylum: Bacteroidota
- Class: Cytophagia
- Order: Cytophagales
- Family: Spirosomataceae
- Genus: Dyadobacter
- Species: D. sediminis

Binomial name
- Dyadobacter sediminis Tian et al. 2015

Type strain
- CGMCC 1.12895, Z12, JCM 30073

Species of bacterium

Dyadobacter sediminis is a Gram-negative, aerobic, rod-shaped and non-motile bacterium from the genus Dyadobacter.
