= Dyadobacter psychrophilus =

Scientific classification
- Domain: Bacteria
- Kingdom: Pseudomonadati
- Phylum: Bacteroidota
- Class: Cytophagia
- Order: Cytophagales
- Family: Spirosomataceae
- Genus: Dyadobacter
- Species: D. psychrophilus

Binomial name
- Dyadobacter psychrophilus Zhang et al. 2010

Type strain
- BZ26, CGMCC 1.8951, CIP 110129, DSM 22270

Species of bacterium

Dyadobacter psychrophilus is a Gram-negative, aerobic and psychrophilic bacterium from the genus Dyadobacter which has been from soil which was contaminated with hydrocarbon in Bozen in Italy.
