= Arcicella rigui =

Scientific classification
- Domain: Bacteria
- Kingdom: Pseudomonadati
- Phylum: Bacteroidota
- Class: Cytophagia
- Order: Cytophagales
- Family: Spirosomataceae
- Genus: Arcicella
- Species: A. rigui

Binomial name
- Arcicella rigui Chen et al. 2013

Type strain
- BCRC 80260, KCTC 23307, NSW-5

Species of bacterium

Arcicella rigui is a Gram-negative, strictly aerobic, vibrioid, polymorphic and non-motile bacterium from the genus Arcicella which has been isolated from water from the Niao-Song Wetland Park in Taiwan.
