= Rhabdobacter roseus =

Scientific classification
- Domain: Bacteria
- Kingdom: Pseudomonadati
- Phylum: Bacteroidota
- Class: Cytophagia
- Order: Cytophagales
- Family: Spirosomataceae
- Genus: Rhabdobacter
- Species: R. roseus

Binomial name
- Rhabdobacter roseus Dahal and Kim 2016

Type strain
- JCM 30685, KACC 18395, KEMB 9005-318, R49

Species of bacterium

Rhabdobacter roseus is a Gram-negative, aerobic, non-spore-forming and non-motile bacterium from the genus Rhabdobacter which has been isolated from soil.
