= Emticicia aquatica =

Scientific classification
- Domain: Bacteria
- Kingdom: Pseudomonadati
- Phylum: Bacteroidota
- Class: Cytophagia
- Order: Cytophagales
- Family: Spirosomataceae
- Genus: Emticicia
- Species: E. aquatica

Binomial name
- Emticicia aquatica Joung et al. 2015

Type strain
- CECT 8858, HMF2925, KCTC 42574

Synonyms
- Emticicia aquaticum

Species of bacterium

Emticicia aquatica is a Gram-negative bacterium from the genus Emticicia which has been isolated from fresh water in Korea.
