= Runella limosa =

Scientific classification
- Domain: Bacteria
- Kingdom: Pseudomonadati
- Phylum: Bacteroidota
- Class: Cytophagia
- Order: Cytophagales
- Family: Spirosomataceae
- Genus: Runella
- Species: R. limosa

Binomial name
- Runella limosa Ryu et al. 2006

Type strain
- DSM 17973, EMB111, KCTC 12615

Species of bacterium

Runella defluvii is a Gram-negative, rod-shaped, strictly aerobic and non-motile bacterium from the genus Runella which has been isolated from activated sludge in Korea.
