= Dyadobacter alkalitolerans =

Scientific classification
- Domain: Bacteria
- Kingdom: Pseudomonadati
- Phylum: Bacteroidota
- Class: Cytophagia
- Order: Cytophagales
- Family: Spirosomataceae
- Genus: Dyadobacter
- Species: D. alkalitolerans

Binomial name
- Dyadobacter alkalitolerans Tang et al. 2009

Type strain
- 12116, CCTCC AB 207176, NRRL B-51268

Species of bacterium

Dyadobacter alkalitolerans is a Gram-negative, aerobic, rod-shaped and non-motile bacterium from the genus Dyadobacter which has been isolated from desert sand in Xinjiang in China.
