= Dyadobacter beijingensis =

Scientific classification
- Domain: Bacteria
- Kingdom: Pseudomonadati
- Phylum: Bacteroidota
- Class: Cytophagia
- Order: Cytophagales
- Family: Spirosomataceae
- Genus: Dyadobacter
- Species: D. beijingensis

Binomial name
- Dyadobacter beijingensis Dong et al. 2007

Type strain
- CGMCC 1.6375, DSM 21582, A54, JCM 14200

Species of bacterium

Dyadobacter beijingensis is a bacterium from the genus Dyadobacter, which has been isolated from the rhizosphere from turf grasses from the Taoranting Park in Beijing, China.
