= Emticicia fontis =

Scientific classification
- Domain: Bacteria
- Kingdom: Pseudomonadati
- Phylum: Bacteroidota
- Class: Cytophagia
- Order: Cytophagales
- Family: Spirosomataceae
- Genus: Emticicia
- Species: E. fontis

Binomial name
- Emticicia fontis Nam et al. 2016

Species of bacterium

Emticicia fontis is a bacterium from the genus Emticicia which has been isolated from a freshwater pond.
