= Larkinella soli =

Scientific classification
- Domain: Bacteria
- Kingdom: Pseudomonadati
- Phylum: Bacteroidota
- Class: Cytophagia
- Order: Cytophagales
- Family: Spirosomataceae
- Genus: Larkinella
- Species: L. soli

Binomial name
- Larkinella soli Xu et al. 2017

Type strain
- KCTC 42800, MCCC 1K01309, strain MIMbqt9

Species of bacterium

Larkinella soli is a Gram-negative, rod-shaped, aerobic and motile bacterium from the genus Larkinella which has been isolated from biological soil crusts from Erdos Plateau in the Mongolia.
