= Runella slithyformis =

Scientific classification
- Domain: Bacteria
- Kingdom: Pseudomonadati
- Phylum: Bacteroidota
- Class: Cytophagia
- Order: Cytophagales
- Family: Spirosomataceae
- Genus: Runella
- Species: R. slithyformis

Binomial name
- Runella slithyformis Larkin and Williams 1978

Type strain
- ATCC 29530, DSM 19594, KCTC 12163, Larkin LSU 4, LARKINLSU4, LMG 11500, LSU 4, NCIMB 11436

Species of bacterium

Runella slithyformis is a bacterium from the genus Runella which has been isolated from a fresh water lake in Baton Rouge in the United States.
