= Dyadobacter ginsengisoli =

Scientific classification
- Domain: Bacteria
- Kingdom: Pseudomonadati
- Phylum: Bacteroidota
- Class: Cytophagia
- Order: Cytophagales
- Family: Spirosomataceae
- Genus: Dyadobacter
- Species: D. ginsengisoli

Binomial name
- Dyadobacter ginsengisoli Liu et al. 2006

Type strain
- DSM 21015, KCTC 12589, LMG 23409, Gsoil 043

Species of bacterium

Dyadobacter ginsengisoli is a Gram-negative, non-spore-forming, rod-shaped, aerobic and non-motile Gram-negative bacterium from the genus Dyadobacter which has been isolated from soil from a ginseng field in Pocheon in Korea.
