= Aa lozanoi =

Scientific classification
- Kingdom: Plantae
- Clade: Tracheophytes
- Clade: Angiosperms
- Clade: Monocots
- Order: Asparagales
- Family: Orchidaceae
- Subfamily: Orchidoideae
- Tribe: Cranichideae
- Genus: Aa
- Species: A. lozanoi

Binomial name
- Aa lozanoi Szlach. & S.Nowak, 2014

Species of orchid

Aa lozanoi is a species of orchid in the genus Aa. It is native to Colombia.

== Description ==
It is a medium-sized, cold growing terrestrial with an erect, slender stem carrying leaves that are gone by flowering time. It blooms in the late winter, late summer, and spring. The sheathes are loose, between 12 and 18 centimeters long, and terminated by a cylindrical inflorescence. The inflorescence is 4 to 8 centimeters long and many flowered. It is in many ways similar to Aa argyrolepis but this species has entire margins to the sepals, petals, and floral bracts. The lips are also very thick and fleshy, especially in the center. The clinandrium is very obscure and the anther is shortly stalked.
