= Runella zeae =

Scientific classification
- Domain: Bacteria
- Kingdom: Pseudomonadati
- Phylum: Bacteroidota
- Class: Cytophagia
- Order: Cytophagales
- Family: Spirosomataceae
- Genus: Runella
- Species: R. zeae

Binomial name
- Runella zeae Chelius et al. 2002

Type strain
- ATCC BAA-293, DSM 19591, KCTC 12164, LMG 21438, M. Chelius, NS12

Species of bacterium

Runella zeae is a Gram-negative bacterium from the genus Runella which has been isolated from the stem of the mais plant Zea mays in Madison in the United States.
