= Larkinella rosea =

Scientific classification
- Domain: Bacteria
- Kingdom: Pseudomonadati
- Phylum: Bacteroidota
- Class: Cytophagia
- Order: Cytophagales
- Family: Spirosomataceae
- Genus: Larkinella
- Species: L. rosea

Binomial name
- Larkinella rosea Lee et al. 2018

Type strain
- JCM 31991, KCTC 52004, strain 15J16-1T3A

Synonyms
- Larkinella roseus

Species of bacterium

Larkinella rosea is a bacterium from the genus Larkinella which has been isolated from beach soil.
