= Dyadobacter crusticola =

Scientific classification
- Domain: Bacteria
- Kingdom: Pseudomonadati
- Phylum: Bacteroidota
- Class: Cytophagia
- Order: Cytophagales
- Family: Spirosomataceae
- Genus: Dyadobacter
- Species: D. crusticola

Binomial name
- Dyadobacter crusticola Reddy and Garcia-Pichel 2005

Type strain
- ATCC BAA-1036, CIP 109009, CP183-8, DSM 16708, VTT E-072669

Species of bacterium

Dyadobacter crusticola is a Gram-negative, psychrotolerant, aerobic and non-motile bacterium from the genus Dyadobacter which has been isolated from biological soil crusts from the Colorado Plateau in the United States.
