= Runella defluvii =

Scientific classification
- Domain: Bacteria
- Kingdom: Pseudomonadati
- Phylum: Bacteroidota
- Class: Cytophagia
- Order: Cytophagales
- Family: Spirosomataceae
- Genus: Runella
- Species: R. defluvii

Binomial name
- Runella defluvii Lu et al. 2007

Type strain
- DSM 17976, EMB13, KCTC 12614

Species of bacterium

Runella defluvii is a Gram-negative and rod-shaped bacterium from the genus Runella which has been isolated from activated sludge from a wastewater treatment plant in Pohang in Korea.
