= Leadbetterella byssophila =

Scientific classification
- Domain: Bacteria
- Kingdom: Pseudomonadati
- Phylum: Bacteroidota
- Class: Cytophagia
- Order: Cytophagales
- Family: Spirosomataceae
- Genus: Leadbetterella
- Species: L. byssophila

Binomial name
- Leadbetterella byssophila Weon et al. 2005

Type strain
- 4M15, DSM 17132, JCM 16389, KACC 11308

Species of bacterium

Leadbetterella byssophila is a Gram-negative, aerobic rod-shaped and non-motile bacterium from the genus Leadbetterella which has been isolated from cotton waste compost in Korea.
