= Arcicella aquatica =

Scientific classification
- Domain: Bacteria
- Kingdom: Pseudomonadati
- Phylum: Bacteroidota
- Class: Cytophagia
- Order: Cytophagales
- Family: Spirosomataceae
- Genus: Arcicella
- Species: A. aquatica

Binomial name
- Arcicella aquatica Nikitin et al. 2004

Type strain
- CIP 107990, DSM 17092, LMG 21963, NO-502

Synonyms
- Arcocella aquatica

Species of bacterium

Arcicella aquatica is a bacterium from the genus Arcicella which has been isolated from the neuston film of a freshwater lake in Russia.
