= Larkinella harenae =

Scientific classification
- Domain: Bacteria
- Kingdom: Pseudomonadati
- Phylum: Bacteroidota
- Class: Cytophagia
- Order: Cytophagales
- Family: Spirosomataceae
- Genus: Larkinella
- Species: L. harenae

Binomial name
- Larkinella harenae Park et al. 2017

Type strain
- JCM 31656, KCTC 42999, strain 15J9-9

Species of bacterium

Larkinella harenae is a Gram-negative and short rod-shaped bacterium from the genus Larkinella which has been isolated from soil from the Iho Tewoo Beach in Korea.
