= Larkinella ripae =

Scientific classification
- Domain: Bacteria
- Kingdom: Pseudomonadati
- Phylum: Bacteroidota
- Class: Cytophagia
- Order: Cytophagales
- Family: Spirosomataceae
- Genus: Larkinella
- Species: L. ripae

Binomial name
- Larkinella ripae Lee et al. 2017

Type strain
- JCM 31657, KCTC 42996, strain 15J11-11

Species of bacterium

Larkinella ripae is a Gram-negative and short rod-shaped bacterium from the genus Larkinella which has been isolated from seashore soil.
