= Arcicella rosea =

Scientific classification
- Domain: Bacteria
- Kingdom: Pseudomonadati
- Phylum: Bacteroidota
- Class: Cytophagia
- Order: Cytophagales
- Family: Spirosomataceae
- Genus: Arcicella
- Species: A. rosea

Binomial name
- Arcicella rosea Kämpfer et al. 2009

Type strain
- CCM 7523, CCUG 55942, TW5

Synonyms
- Arcicella aquiviva

Species of bacterium

Arcicella rosea is a Gram-negative bacterium from the genus Arcicella which has been isolated from tap water.
