= Dyadobacter soli =

Scientific classification
- Domain: Bacteria
- Kingdom: Pseudomonadati
- Phylum: Bacteroidota
- Class: Cytophagia
- Order: Cytophagales
- Family: Spirosomataceae
- Genus: Dyadobacter
- Species: D. soli

Binomial name
- Dyadobacter soli Lee et al. 2010

Type strain
- DSM 25329, MJ20, JCM 16232, KCTC 22481

Species of bacterium

Dyadobacter soli is a Gram-negative, aerobic and non-motile bacterium from the genus Dyadobacter which has been isolated from farm soil near Daejeon in Korea. Dyadobacter soli has the ability to degrade starch
