= Larkinella arboricola =

Scientific classification
- Domain: Bacteria
- Kingdom: Pseudomonadati
- Phylum: Bacteroidota
- Class: Cytophagia
- Order: Cytophagales
- Family: Spirosomataceae
- Genus: Larkinella
- Species: L. arboricola

Binomial name
- Larkinella arboricola Kulichevskaya et al. 2010

Type strain
- DSM 21851, VKM B-2528, Z-0532

Species of bacterium

Larkinella arboricola is a Gram-negative, aerobic, chemoorganotrophic, mesophilic, moderately acidophilic and spiral-shaped bacterium from the genus Larkinella which has been isolated from decomposing wood in Moscow in Russia.
