= Emticicia oligotrophica =

Scientific classification
- Domain: Bacteria
- Kingdom: Pseudomonadati
- Phylum: Bacteroidota
- Class: Cytophagia
- Order: Cytophagales
- Family: Spirosomataceae
- Genus: Emticicia
- Species: E. oligotrophica

Binomial name
- Emticicia oligotrophica Saha and Chakrabarti 2006

Type strain
- DSM 17448, GPTSA 100-15, MTCC 6937

Synonyms
- Emticicia oligotropha Tyrosinophaga indica

Species of bacterium

Emticicia oligotrophica is a bacterium from the genus Emticicia which has been isolated from warm spring water from Jorhat in India.
