= Aquirufa =

Scientific classification
- Domain: Bacteria
- Kingdom: Pseudomonadati
- Phylum: Bacteroidota
- Class: Cytophagia
- Order: Cytophagales
- Family: Spirosomataceae
- Genus: Aquirufa; Pitt et al. 2019

Type species
- Aquirufa antheringensis

Species
- A. antheringensis Pitt et al. 2019; A. nivalisilvae Pitt et al. 2019; A. rosea Sheu et al. 2020; A. beregesia Pitt et al. 2020; A. ecclesiirivi Pitt et al. 2020; A. aurantiipilula Pitt et al. 2022; A. lenticrescens Pitt et al. 2022

Genus of bacteria

Aquirufa is a genus of red-pigmented freshwater bacteria affiliated with the family Spirosomataceae.

Bacteria of this genus were mainly observed in running and standing freshwater systems. It is not known, if these bacteria predominantly dwell as attached bacteria in biofilms or if they have a pelagic lifestyle. Currently, the genus harbours seven species, which were mainly isolated from freshwater ecosystems located in Austria. The type strain of A. antheringensis was isolated from Antheringer Creek running through the town Anthering near the city of Salzburg. The type strain of A. nivalisilvae was isolated from a small intermittent freshwater pond located in a forest in Schneegattern (Lengau), Austria. The scientific name of this species refers to the name of the forest, where it was first discovered. This species also includes a strain initially described as Allopseudarcicella aquatilis, which was shown to be a later synonym of A. nivalisilvae. The description of the species A. rosea is based on a type strain obtained from a freshwater lake in Taiwan. The type strains of the recently described species A. beregesia was isolated from Kirchstaettbach, a small creek with medium conductivity and nearly neutral pH located in Obertrum, Austria. The name of this species refers to the high school Bundesrealgymnasium Seekirchen (acronym BRGS) to honor students of the school, which were involved in isolation of the strain, as well as in creation of the species epithet. The type strain of Aquirufa ecclesiirivi originates from the same small creek as the type strain of A. beregesia and its species name refers to the name of this creek. The type strain of the species Aquirufa aurantiipilula was isolated from Moosbach, a small creek running through Mondsee, a small town located near Salzburg, Austria. Strain 9H-EGSE, which is the type strain of the species Aquirufa lenticrescens originated from Grossegelsee, a small natural pond located near the town of Mattsee, Austria.

BLAST searches against GenBank indicated that Aquirufa spp. were frequently detected by cultivation-independent investigations on bacterial diversity of freshwater systems, however, in many cases the detections were misinterpreted as Pseudarcicella (a related genus) detection.
