= Treatia indica =

Scientific classification
- Kingdom: Animalia
- Phylum: Arthropoda
- Subphylum: Chelicerata
- Class: Arachnida
- Order: Mesostigmata
- Family: Otopheidomenidae
- Genus: Treatia
- Species: T. indica

Binomial name
- Treatia indica Krantz & Khot, 1962

Species of mite

Treatia indica is a species of mite in the family Otopheidomenidae.
