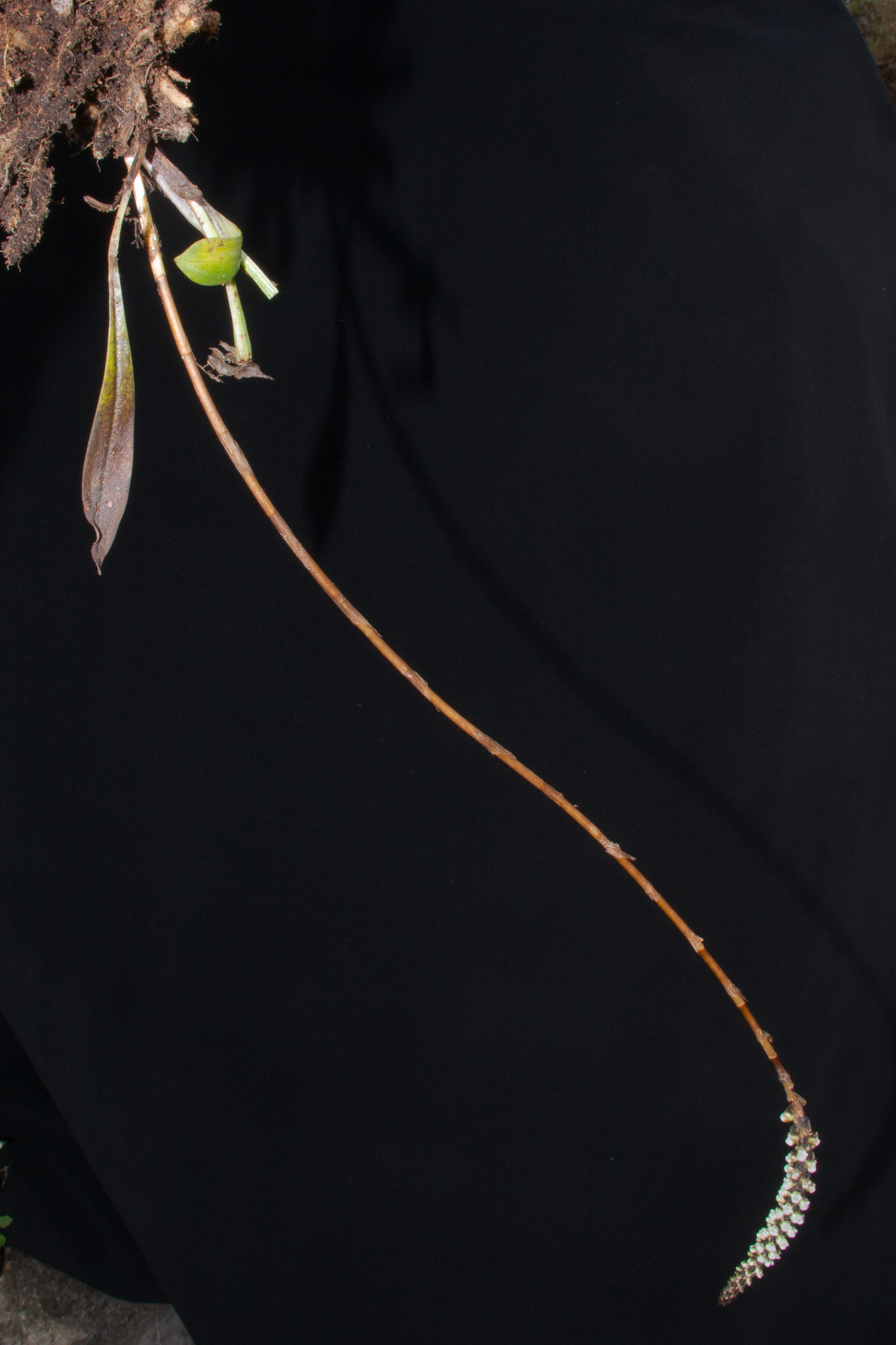

Conservation status
- Data Deficient (IUCN 3.1)

Scientific classification
- Kingdom: Plantae
- Clade: Embryophytes
- Clade: Tracheophytes
- Clade: Spermatophytes
- Clade: Angiosperms
- Clade: Monocots
- Order: Asparagales
- Family: Orchidaceae
- Subfamily: Orchidoideae
- Tribe: Cranichideae
- Genus: Aa
- Species: A. matthewsii

Binomial name
- Aa matthewsii (Rchb.f.) Schltr., 1912

Synonyms
- Aa lechleri Schltr.; Aa mathewsii (Rchb.f.) Schltr.; Altensteinia mathewsii Rchb. f.; Altensteinia matthewsii Rchb.f.

= Aa matthewsii =

Species of orchid

Aa matthewsii is a species of orchid. It is found in Peru and western Bolivia. It grows in Andean grasslands at elevations of 3,000–4,600 m (9,800–15,100 ft) above sea level.
