= Runella =

Scientific classification
- Domain: Bacteria
- Kingdom: Pseudomonadati
- Phylum: Bacteroidota
- Class: Cytophagia
- Order: Cytophagales
- Family: Spirosomataceae
- Genus: Runella; Larkin and Williams 1978

Type species
- Runella slithyformis

Species
- Runella defluvii Runella limosa Runella slithyformis Runella zeae

Genus of bacteria

Runella is a Gram-negative, aerobic and non-motile bacterial genus from the family Spirosomataceae.
