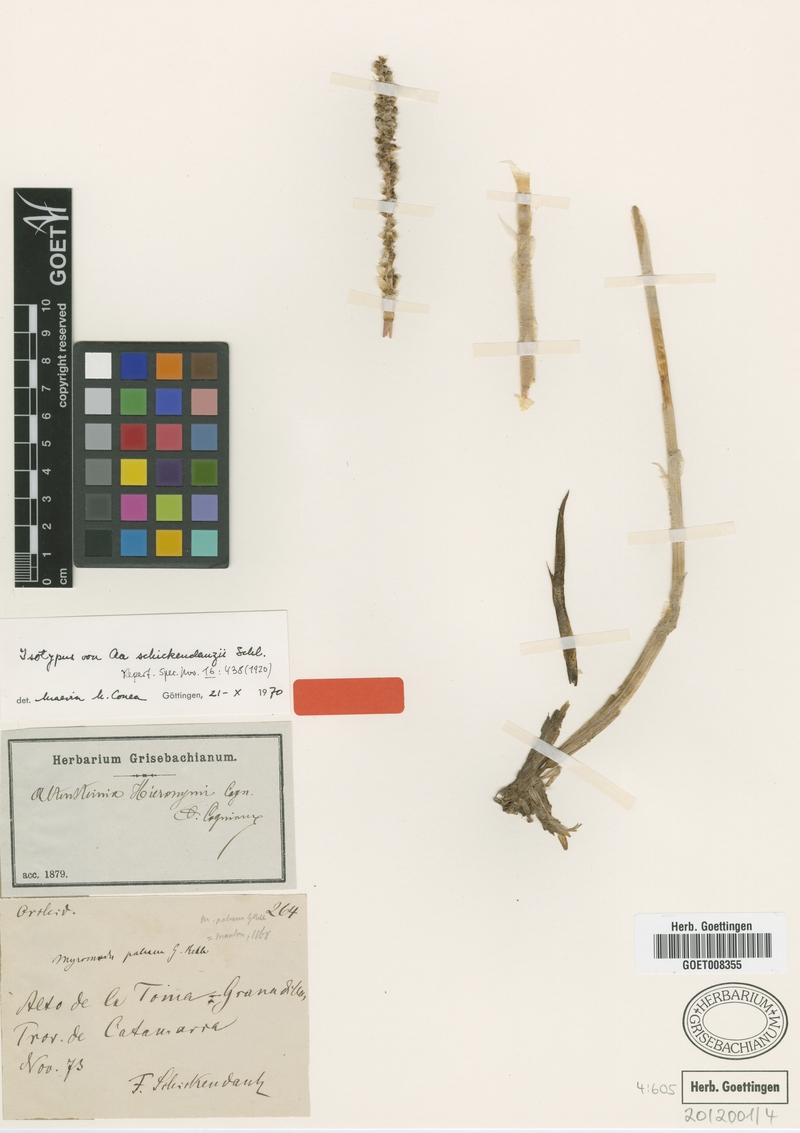

Scientific classification
- Kingdom: Plantae
- Clade: Tracheophytes
- Clade: Angiosperms
- Clade: Monocots
- Order: Asparagales
- Family: Orchidaceae
- Subfamily: Orchidoideae
- Tribe: Cranichideae
- Genus: Aa
- Species: A. schickendanzii

Binomial name
- Aa schickendanzii Schltr., 1920

= Aa schickendanzii =

Species of orchid

Aa schickendanzii is a species of orchid in the genus Aa.

It is endemic to northwest Argentina.
