= Aa hieronymi =

Scientific classification
- Kingdom: Plantae
- Clade: Tracheophytes
- Clade: Angiosperms
- Clade: Monocots
- Order: Asparagales
- Family: Orchidaceae
- Subfamily: Orchidoideae
- Tribe: Cranichideae
- Genus: Aa
- Species: A. hieronymi

Binomial name
- Aa hieronymi (Cogn.) Schltr.

Synonyms
- Altensteinia hieronymi Cogn.

Species of orchid

Aa hieronymi is a species of orchid in the genus Aa.

It is found in northwestern Argentina.
