= Myrosmodes inaequalis =

Scientific classification
- Kingdom: Plantae
- Clade: Tracheophytes
- Clade: Angiosperms
- Clade: Monocots
- Order: Asparagales
- Family: Orchidaceae
- Subfamily: Orchidoideae
- Tribe: Cranichideae
- Genus: Myrosmodes
- Species: M. inaequalis

Binomial name
- Myrosmodes inaequalis (Rchb.f.) C.A.Vargas

Species of orchid

Myrosmodes inaequalis (synonym: Aa inaequalis) is a species of orchid in the genus Myrosmodes.

It is native to Peru and Bolivia.
