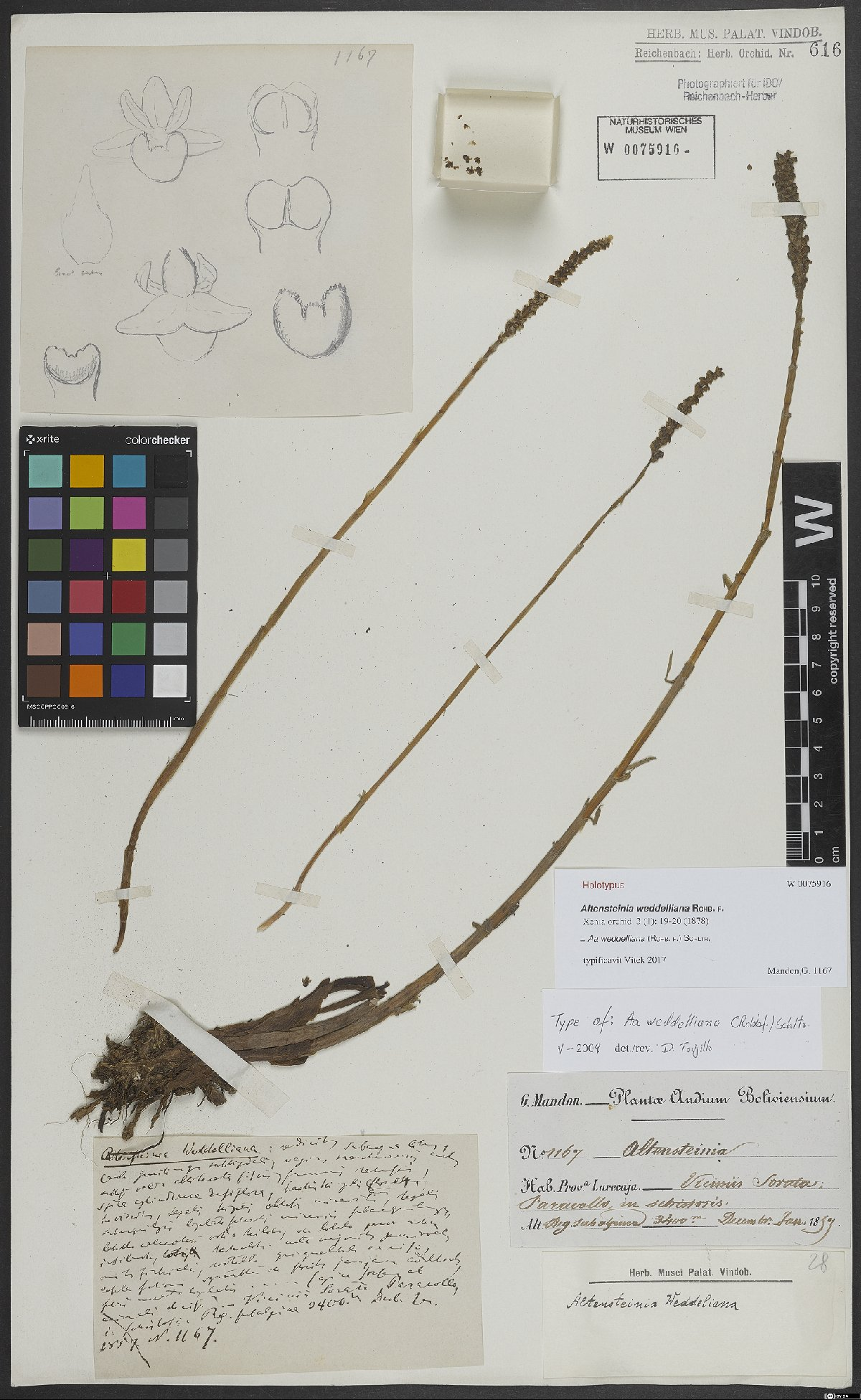

Scientific classification
- Kingdom: Plantae
- Clade: Tracheophytes
- Clade: Angiosperms
- Clade: Monocots
- Order: Asparagales
- Family: Orchidaceae
- Subfamily: Orchidoideae
- Tribe: Cranichideae
- Genus: Aa
- Species: A. weddelliana

Binomial name
- Aa weddelliana Schltr., 1912

= Aa weddelliana =

Species of orchid

Aa weddelliana is a species of orchid in the genus Aa.

It is native to Peru, Bolivia and Northwest Argentina at altitudes of 2700 to 3800 meters. It blooms in the summer.
