= Orthopteroseius =

Scientific classification
- Domain: Eukaryota
- Kingdom: Animalia
- Phylum: Arthropoda
- Subphylum: Chelicerata
- Class: Arachnida
- Order: Mesostigmata
- Family: Otopheidomenidae
- Genus: Orthopteroseius; Mo, 1996
- Species: O. sinicus

Binomial name
- Orthopteroseius sinicus Mo, 1996

Genus of mites

Orthopteroseius is a genus of mites in the family Otopheidomenidae. There is at least one described species in Orthopteroseius, O. sinicus.
