= Arcicella =

Scientific classification
- Domain: Bacteria
- Kingdom: Pseudomonadati
- Phylum: Bacteroidota
- Class: Cytophagia
- Order: Cytophagales
- Family: Spirosomataceae
- Genus: Arcicella; Nikitin et al. 2004

Type species
- Arcicella aquatica

Species
- Arcicella aquatica Arcicella aurantiaca Arcicella rigui Arcicella rosea

Synonyms
- Arcocella

Genus of bacteria

Arcicella is a genus of aerobic bacteria from the family Spirosomataceae.
