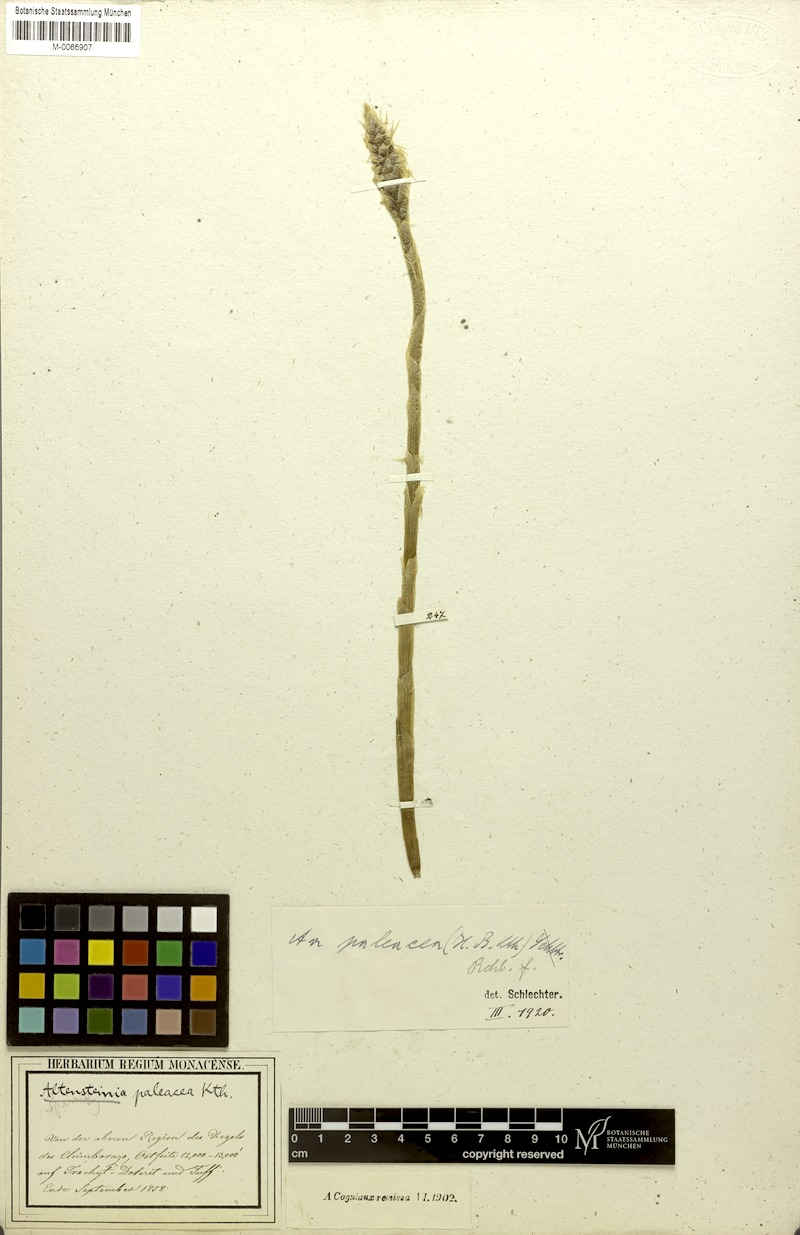

Scientific classification
- Kingdom: Plantae
- Clade: Tracheophytes
- Clade: Angiosperms
- Clade: Monocots
- Order: Asparagales
- Family: Orchidaceae
- Subfamily: Orchidoideae
- Tribe: Cranichideae
- Genus: Aa
- Species: A. paleacea

Binomial name
- Aa paleacea (Kunth) Rchb.f.

= Aa paleacea =

Species of orchid

Aa paleacea is an orchid in the genus Aa. It is native to the Andes, between southern Costa Rica, Peru and Ecuador, at an altitude of 2900–4400 metres. It is the type species for the genus.
