= Nabiseius =

Scientific classification
- Domain: Eukaryota
- Kingdom: Animalia
- Phylum: Arthropoda
- Subphylum: Chelicerata
- Class: Arachnida
- Order: Mesostigmata
- Family: Otopheidomenidae
- Genus: Nabiseius; Chant & Lindquist, 1965
- Species: N. arabicus

Binomial name
- Nabiseius arabicus Negm & Alatawi, 2013

Genus of mites

Nabiseius is a genus of mites in the family Otopheidomenidae. There is at least one described species in Nabiseius, N. arabicus.
