= Arcicella aurantiaca =

Scientific classification
- Domain: Bacteria
- Kingdom: Pseudomonadati
- Phylum: Bacteroidota
- Class: Cytophagia
- Order: Cytophagales
- Family: Spirosomataceae
- Genus: Arcicella
- Species: A. aurantiaca

Binomial name
- Arcicella aurantiaca Sheu et al. 2010

Type strain
- BCRC 17969, DSM 22214, LMG 25207, TNR-18

Species of bacterium

Arcicella aurantiaca is a Gram-negative, strictly aerobic, vibrioid and non-motile bacterium from the genus Arcicella which has been isolated from stream water in Kaohsiung in Taiwan.
