= Aa macra =

Scientific classification
- Kingdom: Plantae
- Clade: Tracheophytes
- Clade: Angiosperms
- Clade: Monocots
- Order: Asparagales
- Family: Orchidaceae
- Subfamily: Orchidoideae
- Tribe: Cranichideae
- Genus: Aa
- Species: A. macra

Binomial name
- Aa macra Schltr., 1921

Species of orchid

Aa macra is a species of orchid in the genus Aa. It is found in Ecuador.
