= Aa riobambae =

Scientific classification
- Kingdom: Plantae
- Clade: Tracheophytes
- Clade: Angiosperms
- Clade: Monocots
- Order: Asparagales
- Family: Orchidaceae
- Subfamily: Orchidoideae
- Tribe: Cranichideae
- Genus: Aa
- Species: A. riobambae

Binomial name
- Aa riobambae Schltr., 1921

Species of orchid

Aa riobambae is a species of orchid in the genus Aa.

It is native to Ecuador, where it grows at altitudes of 3,300 to 3,800 meters.
