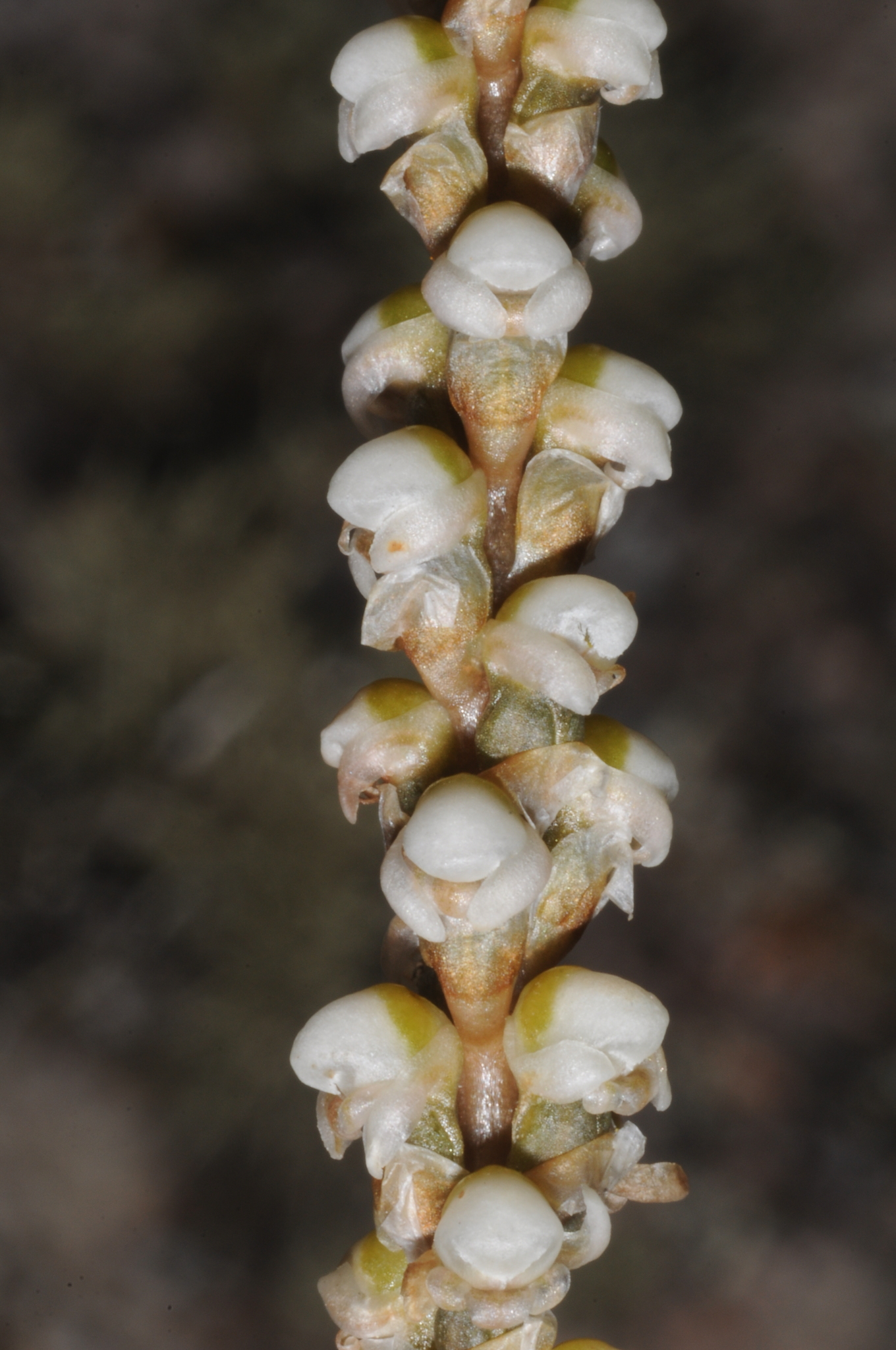

Scientific classification
- Kingdom: Plantae
- Clade: Tracheophytes
- Clade: Angiosperms
- Clade: Monocots
- Order: Asparagales
- Family: Orchidaceae
- Subfamily: Orchidoideae
- Tribe: Cranichideae
- Genus: Aa
- Species: A. achalensis

Binomial name
- Aa achalensis Schltr., 1920

= Aa achalensis =

Species of orchid

Aa achalensis is a species of terrestrial orchid in the genus Aa. It is found at high altitudes in Argentina's Sierras de Córdoba.

== Distribution and habitat ==
Endemic to parts of the Sierras de Córdoba in northern Argentina, Aa achalensis is most common between 1,500 to 2,500 metres (0.93 to 1.55 mi) above sea level, though it can be found as high 3,500 metres (2.2 mi). The species grows in mountain forests and grasslands. Like many orchids, it associates with fungal orchid mycorrhiza, but also with dark septate endophytes.

== Description ==
Aa achalensis grows between 20 and 30 centimetres (7.9 and 11.8 in) tall. It can be differentiated by its hairless rachises, scapes, and ovaries, a trait no other Argentinian Aa species possesses. Inflorescences have small white raceme flowers. They flower in summer, between September and December, and fruit until April.

== Taxonomy ==
Aa achalensis was first described from near Cerro Champaquí by Rudolf Schlechter. The type specimen, housed in the Berlin Herbarium, was destroyed during the Second World War.

== Conservation ==
A 2004 paper assessing endemic plant species in Córdoba against the IUCN 1994 Red List categories classified Aa achalensis as "Vulnerable".
