= Aa rosei =

Scientific classification
- Kingdom: Plantae
- Clade: Tracheophytes
- Clade: Angiosperms
- Clade: Monocots
- Order: Asparagales
- Family: Orchidaceae
- Subfamily: Orchidoideae
- Tribe: Cranichideae
- Genus: Aa
- Species: A. rosei

Binomial name
- Aa rosei Ames

Species of orchid

Aa rosei is a species of orchid in the genus Aa. It is endemic to Peru. Its common name is the Rose's Aa.
