= Katydiseius =

Scientific classification
- Domain: Eukaryota
- Kingdom: Animalia
- Phylum: Arthropoda
- Subphylum: Chelicerata
- Class: Arachnida
- Order: Mesostigmata
- Family: Otopheidomenidae
- Genus: Katydiseius; Fain & Lukoschus, 1983

Genus of mites

Katydiseius is a genus of mites in the family Otopheidomenidae.
