= Otopheidomenis zalelestes =

Scientific classification
- Kingdom: Animalia
- Phylum: Arthropoda
- Subphylum: Chelicerata
- Class: Arachnida
- Order: Mesostigmata
- Family: Otopheidomenidae
- Genus: Otopheidomenis
- Species: O. zalelestes

Binomial name
- Otopheidomenis zalelestes Treat, 1955

Species of mite

Otopheidomenis zalelestes is a species of mite in the family Otopheidomenidae.
