= Aa trilobulata =

Scientific classification
- Kingdom: Plantae
- Clade: Tracheophytes
- Clade: Angiosperms
- Clade: Monocots
- Order: Asparagales
- Family: Orchidaceae
- Subfamily: Orchidoideae
- Tribe: Cranichideae
- Genus: Aa
- Species: A. trilobulata

Binomial name
- Aa trilobulata Schltr.

Species of orchid

Aa trilobulata is an orchid in the genus Aa. It is found throughout Bolivia.
