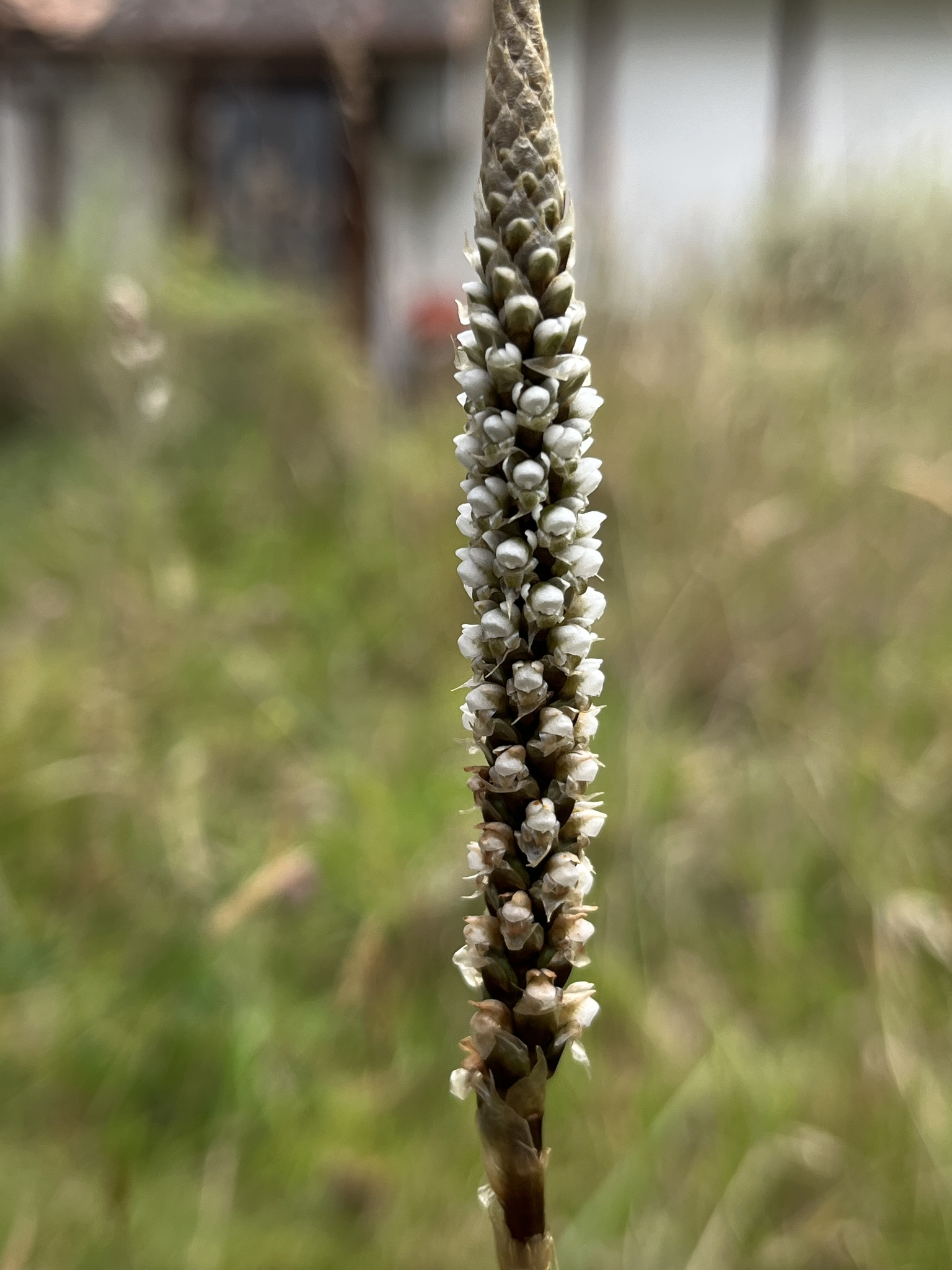

Scientific classification
- Kingdom: Plantae
- Clade: Embryophytes
- Clade: Tracheophytes
- Clade: Spermatophytes
- Clade: Angiosperms
- Clade: Monocots
- Order: Asparagales
- Family: Orchidaceae
- Subfamily: Orchidoideae
- Tribe: Cranichideae
- Genus: Aa
- Species: A. leucantha

Binomial name
- Aa leucantha (Rchb.f.) Schltr.

= Aa leucantha =

Species of orchid

Aa leucantha is a species of orchid in the genus Aa.

It is native to Colombia and Ecuador, where it grows at altitudes of 2800 to 4300 meters. It is listed as an Appendix II species by CITES.
