= Larkinella =

Scientific classification
- Domain: Bacteria
- Kingdom: Pseudomonadati
- Phylum: Bacteroidota
- Class: Cytophagia
- Order: Cytophagales
- Family: Spirosomataceae
- Genus: Larkinella; Vancanneyt et al. 2006

Type species
- Larkinella insperata

Species
- Larkinella arboricola Larkinella bovis Larkinella harenae Larkinella insperata Larkinella knui Larkinella ripae Larkinella rosea Larkinella soli

Genus of bacteria

Larkinella is a Gram-negative, chemoorganotrophic and strictly aerobic bacterial genus from the family Spirosomataceae.
