= Aa lehmannii =

Scientific classification
- Kingdom: Plantae
- Clade: Tracheophytes
- Clade: Angiosperms
- Clade: Monocots
- Order: Asparagales
- Family: Orchidaceae
- Subfamily: Orchidoideae
- Tribe: Cranichideae
- Genus: Aa
- Species: A. lehmannii

Binomial name
- Aa lehmannii Rchb.f. ex Szlach. & Kolan., 2014

Species of orchid

Aa lehmannii is a species of orchid in the genus Aa. It is native to Ecuador.
