= Entomoseius =

Scientific classification
- Domain: Eukaryota
- Kingdom: Animalia
- Phylum: Arthropoda
- Subphylum: Chelicerata
- Class: Arachnida
- Order: Mesostigmata
- Family: Otopheidomenidae
- Genus: Entomoseius; Chant, 1965

Genus of mites

Entomoseius is a genus of mites in the family Otopheidomenidae.
