= Hemipteroseius =

Scientific classification
- Domain: Eukaryota
- Kingdom: Animalia
- Phylum: Arthropoda
- Subphylum: Chelicerata
- Class: Arachnida
- Order: Mesostigmata
- Family: Otopheidomenidae
- Genus: Hemipteroseius; Evans, 1963

Genus of mites

Hemipteroseius is a genus of mites in the family Otopheidomenidae. There are at least three described species in Hemipteroseius.

== Species ==
These three species belong to the genus Hemipteroseius:

- Hemipteroseius ageneius
- Hemipteroseius antilleus
- Hemipteroseius vikrami
