= Aa microtidis =

Scientific classification
- Kingdom: Plantae
- Clade: Tracheophytes
- Clade: Angiosperms
- Clade: Monocots
- Order: Asparagales
- Family: Orchidaceae
- Subfamily: Orchidoideae
- Tribe: Cranichideae
- Genus: Aa
- Species: A. microtidis

Binomial name
- Aa microtidis Schltr.

Species of orchid

Aa microtidis is a species of orchid in the genus Aa.

It was described by Rudolf Schlechter in 1922. The type specimen was collected from rock outcroppings at Puna Patanca, Tarija, Bolivia. Schlechter found that it resembled Aa calceata, but with much smaller flowers.
