= Emticicia =

Scientific classification
- Domain: Bacteria
- Kingdom: Pseudomonadati
- Phylum: Bacteroidota
- Class: Cytophagia
- Order: Cytophagales
- Family: Spirosomataceae
- Genus: Emticicia; Saha and Chakrabarti 2006

Type species
- Emticicia oligotrophica

Species
- Emticicia aquatica Emticicia fontis Emticicia ginsengisoli Emticicia oligotrophica Emticicia sediminis

Synonyms
- Tyrosinophaga

Genus of bacteria

Emticicia is a Gram-negative bacterial genus from the family Spirosomataceae.
