= Aa lorentzii =

Scientific classification
- Kingdom: Plantae
- Clade: Tracheophytes
- Clade: Angiosperms
- Clade: Monocots
- Order: Asparagales
- Family: Orchidaceae
- Subfamily: Orchidoideae
- Tribe: Cranichideae
- Genus: Aa
- Species: A. lorentzii

Binomial name
- Aa lorentzii Schltr., 1920

Species of orchid

Aa lorentzii is a species of orchid. It is endemic to Argentina.
