= Rhabdobacter =

Scientific classification
- Domain: Bacteria
- Kingdom: Pseudomonadati
- Phylum: Bacteroidota
- Class: Cytophagia
- Order: Cytophagales
- Family: Spirosomataceae
- Genus: Rhabdobacter; Dahal and Kim 2016

Type species
- Rhabdobacter roseus

Species
- R. roseus

Genus of bacteria

Rhabdobacter is a bacterial genus from the family of Spirosomataceae.
