= Aa denticulata =

Scientific classification
- Kingdom: Plantae
- Clade: Tracheophytes
- Clade: Angiosperms
- Clade: Monocots
- Order: Asparagales
- Family: Orchidaceae
- Subfamily: Orchidoideae
- Tribe: Cranichideae
- Genus: Aa
- Species: A. denticulata

Binomial name
- Aa denticulata Schltr., 1920

Species of orchid

Aa denticulata is a species of orchid in the genus Aa. It is found in Colombia and Ecuador. It blooms in the winter.
