= Aa figueroae =

Scientific classification
- Kingdom: Plantae
- Clade: Tracheophytes
- Clade: Angiosperms
- Clade: Monocots
- Order: Asparagales
- Family: Orchidaceae
- Subfamily: Orchidoideae
- Tribe: Cranichideae
- Genus: Aa
- Species: A. figueroae

Binomial name
- Aa figueroae Szlach. & S.Nowak, 2014

Species of orchid

Aa figueroae is a species of orchid in the genus Aa.

It is native to Colombia. It is listed as an Appendix II species by CITES.
