= Otopheidomenis =

Scientific classification
- Domain: Eukaryota
- Kingdom: Animalia
- Phylum: Arthropoda
- Subphylum: Chelicerata
- Class: Arachnida
- Order: Mesostigmata
- Family: Otopheidomenidae
- Genus: Otopheidomenis; Treat, 1955

Genus of mites

Otopheidomenis is a genus of mites in the family Otopheidomenidae. There are at least three described species in Otopheidomenis.

== Species ==
These three species belong to the genus Otopheidomenis:

- Otopheidomenis cocytes
- Otopheidomenis kayosiekeri
- Otopheidomenis zalelestes
