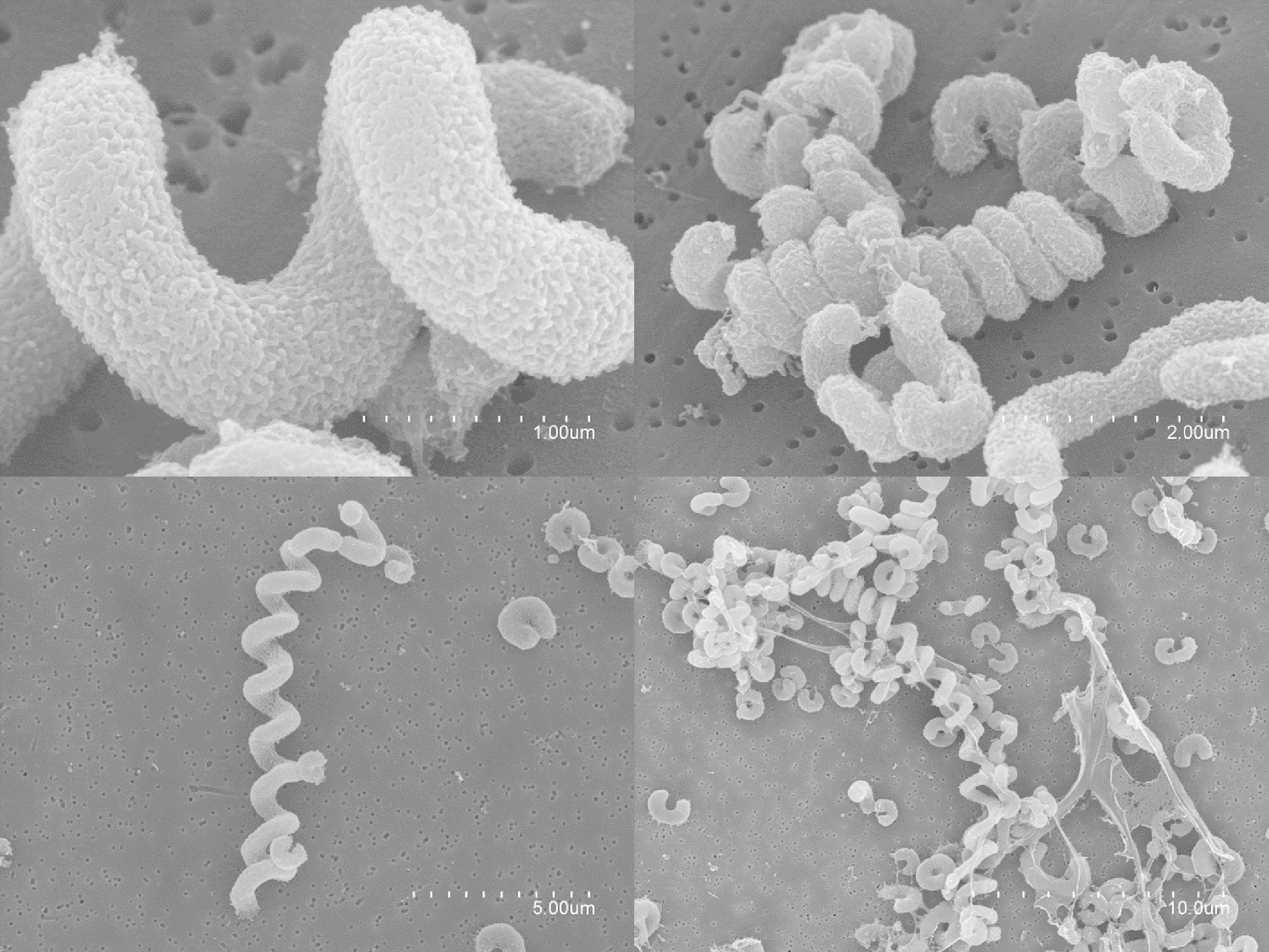
- Image of Dyadobacter helix

Scientific classification
- Domain: Bacteria
- Kingdom: Pseudomonadati
- Phylum: Bacteroidota
- Class: Cytophagia
- Order: Cytophagales
- Family: Spirosomataceae
- Genus: Dyadobacter; Chelius and Triplett 2000

Type species
- Dyadobacter fermentans

Species
- D. alkalitolerans D. arcticus D. beijingensis D. crusticola D. endophyticus D. fermentans D. ginsengisoli D. hamtensis D. jejuensis D. koreensis D. psychrophilus D. sediminis D. soli D. tibetensis

= Dyadobacter =

Genus of bacteria

Dyadobacter is a genus of gram negative rod-shaped bacteria belonging to the family Spirosomataceae in the phylum Bacteroidota. Typical traits of the genus include yellow colony colour, positive flexirubin test and non-motile behaviours. They possess an anaerobic metabolism (oxidase positive), can utilise a broad range of carbon sources, and test positive for peroxide catalase activity. The type species is Dyadobacter fermentans, which was isolated from surface sterilised maize leaves, (apparently named after its ability to ferment glucose and fructose).

Species of Dyadobacter have been isolated from a diverse range of environments worldwide, including glacial ice, seawater and factories, however a large number of the currently described species belonging to the genus Dyadobacter have been isolated from soil communities. Several studies observing the microbiome associated with plants have identified Dyadobacter species. These studies have recognized Dyadobacter strains from microbiomes of corn, potato, canola, wheat and Arabidopsis thaliana. In some cases, Dyadobacter isolates have been shown to be one of the major cohorts of bacteria on plant phyllospheres. It is currently unknown what role Dyadobacter species play in these plant-associated communities.

Several species of Dyadobacter have been identified as potentially useful in bioremediation. Dyadobacter beijingensis was identified in a hydrocarbonoclastic community of bacteria remediating soil contaminated with crude oil, and Strains of D. fermentans have been observed degrading 7,8-Benzoquinoline, an azaarene with mutagenic properties.
