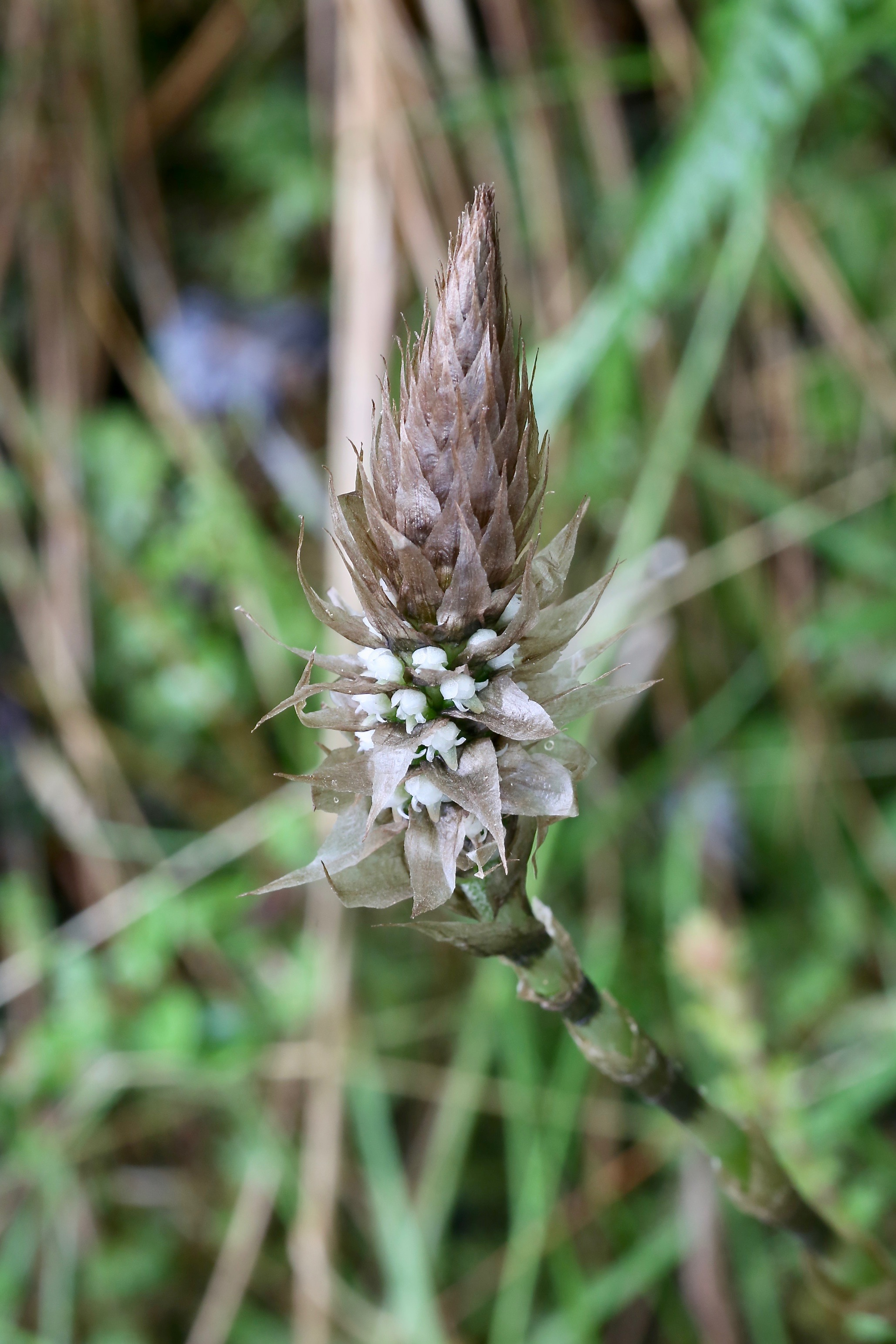

Scientific classification
- Kingdom: Plantae
- Clade: Tracheophytes
- Clade: Angiosperms
- Clade: Monocots
- Order: Asparagales
- Family: Orchidaceae
- Subfamily: Orchidoideae
- Tribe: Cranichideae
- Genus: Aa
- Species: A. maderoi

Binomial name
- Aa maderoi Schltr.

Synonyms
- Aa hartwegii Garay; Altensteinia fragosa Løjtnant

= Aa maderoi =

Species of orchid

Aa maderoi is a species of orchid in the genus Aa. It is native to Ecuador, Colombia, and Venezuela. Its common name is Madero's Aa.

The flower size is 1 inch. It is a cold growing plant with four to six basal leaves that blooms in the spring on erect 70 centimeter long inflorescence with brown bracts and flowers at the apex.
