= Leadbetterella =

Scientific classification
- Domain: Bacteria
- Kingdom: Pseudomonadati
- Phylum: Bacteroidota
- Class: Cytophagia
- Order: Cytophagales
- Family: Spirosomataceae
- Genus: Leadbetterella; Weon et al. 2005

Type species
- Leadbetterella byssophila

Species
- L. byssophila

Genus of bacteria

Leadbetterella is a Gram-negative and strictly aerobic bacterial genus from the family Spirosomataceae, with one known species (Leadbetterella byssophila).
