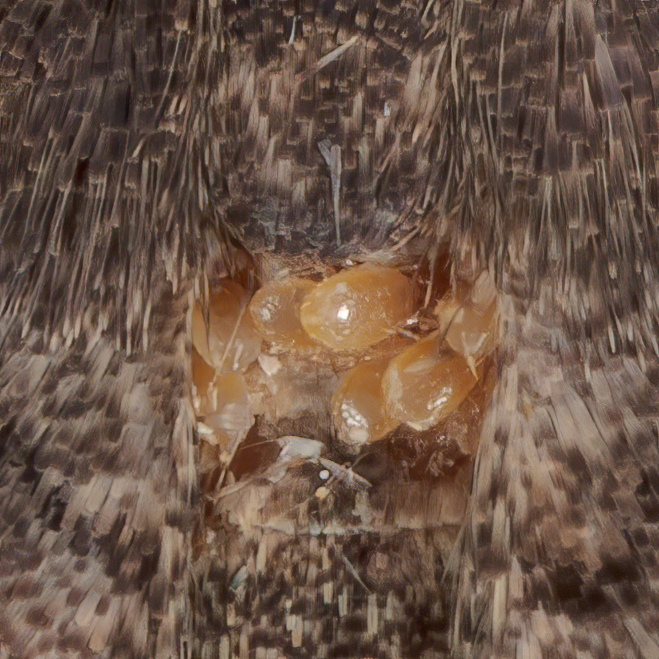
- On Common Idia Moth

Scientific classification
- Kingdom: Animalia
- Phylum: Arthropoda
- Subphylum: Chelicerata
- Class: Arachnida
- Order: Mesostigmata
- Suborder: Monogynaspida
- Infraorder: Gamasina
- Superfamily: Phytoseioidea
- Family: Otopheidomenidae; Treat, 1955

= Otopheidomenidae =

Family of mites

Otopheidomenidae is a family of mites in the order Mesostigmata.

== Species ==
Eickwortius Z. Q. Zhang, 1995

- Eickwortius termes Z. Q. Zhang, 1995

Entomoseius Chant, 1965

- Entomoseius dysderci (Evans)

Hemipteroseius Evans, 1963

- Hemipteroseius vikrami Menon, 2011
- Hemipteroseius womersleyi Evans, 1963

Katydiseius Fain & F. S. Lukoschus, 1983

- Katydiseius nadchatrami Fain & F. S. Lukoschus, 1983

Nabiseius Chant & Lindquist, 1965

- Nabiseius duplicisetus Chant & Lindquist, 1965
- Nabiseius melinae Halliday, 1994
- Nabiseius rivnayae Amitai & Swirski, 1980

Orthopteroseius Mo, 1996

- Orthopteroseius sinicus Mo, 1996

Otopheidomenis Treat, 1955

- Otopheidomenis ascalaphae Syed & Goff, 1983
- Otopheidomenis treati (Prasad, 1968)
- Otopheidomenis zalelestes Treat, 1955

Treatia Krantz & Khot, 1962

- Treatia ageneia (Treat, 1965)
- Treatia antillea (Treat, 1965)
- Treatia antilleus (Treat, 1965)
- Treatia ghaiguptaorum Zhang, 1995
- Treatia indica Krantz & Khot, 1962
- Treatia parvula (Treat, 1965)
- Treatia sabbatica (Treat, 1965)
