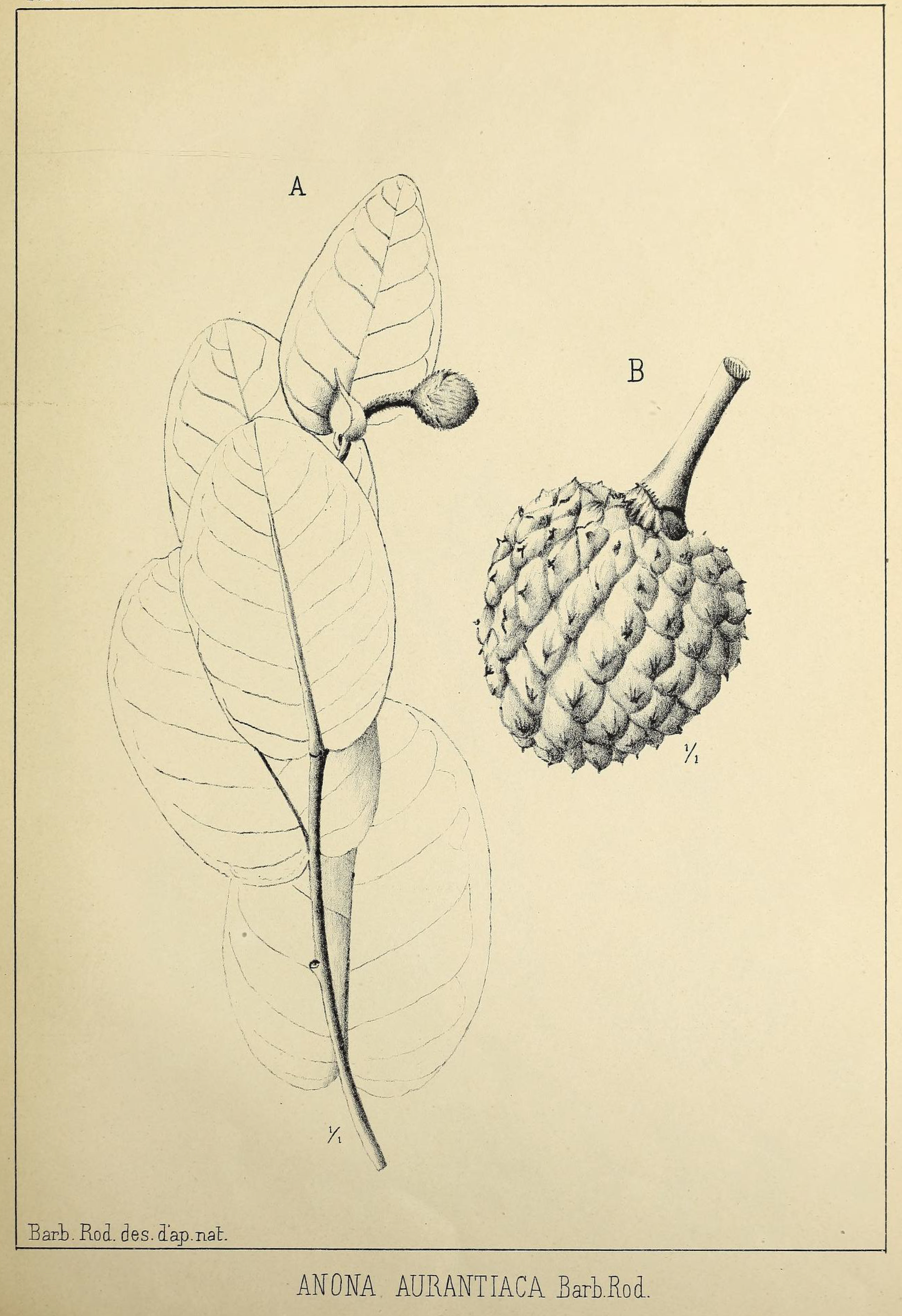
- Botanical illustration of Annona aurantiaca

Conservation status
- Least Concern (IUCN 3.1)

Scientific classification
- Kingdom: Plantae
- Clade: Tracheophytes
- Clade: Angiosperms
- Clade: Magnoliids
- Order: Magnoliales
- Family: Annonaceae
- Genus: Annona
- Species: A. aurantiaca

Binomial name
- Annona aurantiaca Barb.Rodr.

Synonyms
- Annona coriacea var. amplexicaulis S.Moore

= Annona aurantiaca =

Species of flowering plant

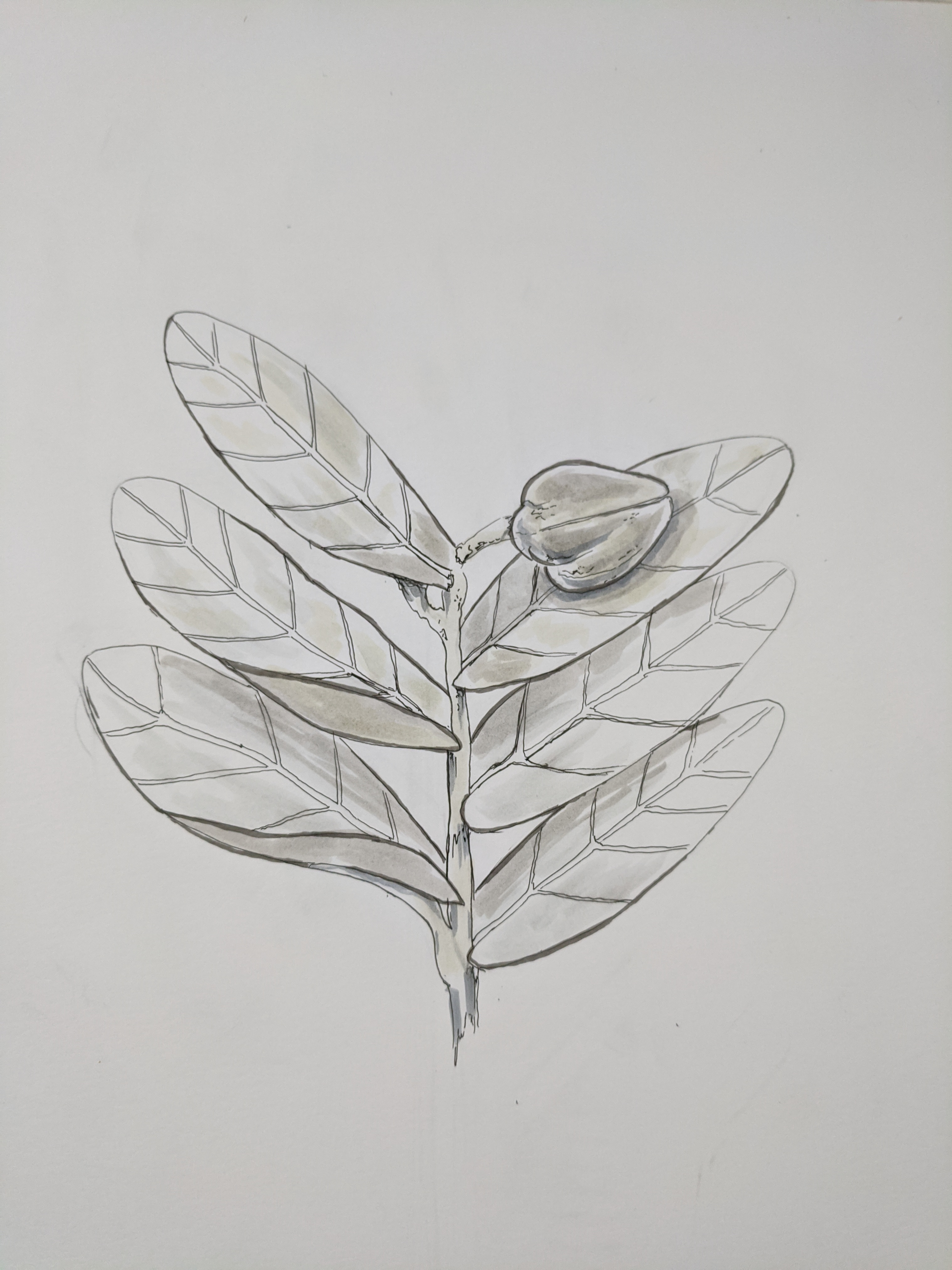
Annona aurantiaca

Annona aurantiaca is a species of plant in the family Annonaceae. It is native to Brazil. João Barbosa Rodrigues, the Brazilian botanist who first formally described the species, named it after its orange colored (aurantiacus in Latin) petals.

== Description ==
It is a woody perennial bush-like tree 1–5 meters in height. Its stems are erect and covered in small hairs called trichomes. Its oblong, leathery, blueish-green leaves lack distinct petioles and are blunt or notched at their tips. The leaves are 3-15 long by 2-7 centimeters wide. Its flowers are solitary on 3 centimeter long peduncles. The outer petals of the flowers are orange. Its berry-fruit are golden yellow to orange with white flesh and black seeds. It has a medium to dark mauve fruit coat color with an uneven, rough outer surface. The simple green leaves are attached to the petiole. The single leaf has an oval shape, smooth margin and rounded blade tip. The leaf phyllotaxy is alternately attached along the stems of the plant. This is called alternate arrangement as the stems grow staggered at different heights from each other. The venation in the leaf blade is pinnate. It has a single midrib and secondary veins branching off the midvein.

== Reproductive biology ==
The pollen of Annona aurantiaca is shed as permanent tetrads. Its flowers open over a two night period with a female phase on the first night, and a male phase on the second night. It is pollinated by the scarab beetle Cyclocephala atricapilla.

== Uses ==
The pulp of the fruit has been reported to be edible and stores well outside. Although the berry-like fruit pulp is sweet and edible, the seed is poisonous.

== Distribution and habitat ==
A. aurantiaca is native to South America and is widely distributed, particularly in the savanna (Cerrado) and forests of Brazil. It grows ideally in shaded areas in sandy, clay soil. This plant is considered fast-growing and develops into a small shrub-like tree reaching approximately 4 meters at maturity.

== Growth and propagation ==
In its native climate, the growing season is year-round. The seeds can germinate between 25-28 degrees Celsius and germination takes between 2 and 6 weeks. Propagation can be achieved by sowing the seeds directly or by planting cuttings. A consistent temperature of 15-20 degrees Celsius is required for successful sowing. Prior to sowing, hot water may be poured over the seeds and the seeds must be allowed to soak for 24 to 48 hours to reduce germination time. This plant requires consistently moist soil to thrive but can tolerate both bright sunlight and partial shade. While requiring consistent moisture, the seed can be planted in potting soil mixed with sand or perlite to ensure proper drainage. The long term use of fertilizer is also effective at assisting in sowing. This plant tends to encounter pests such as spider mites (Tetranychus urticae) particularly in the dry, humid months. To maintain plant health during overwintering, considered between the temperatures of 10-15 degrees Celsius, enough water must be added so that the roots do not dry out completely.
