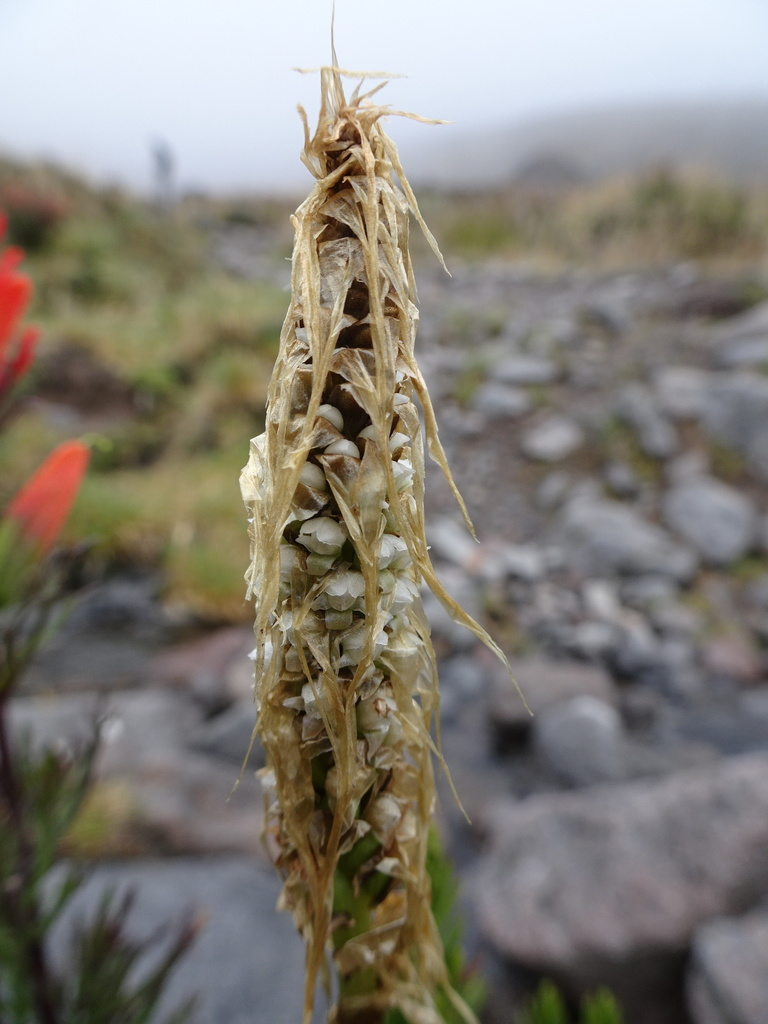

Scientific classification
- Kingdom: Plantae
- Clade: Tracheophytes
- Clade: Angiosperms
- Clade: Monocots
- Order: Asparagales
- Family: Orchidaceae
- Subfamily: Orchidoideae
- Tribe: Cranichideae
- Genus: Aa
- Species: A. colombiana

Binomial name
- Aa colombiana Schltr.

= Aa colombiana =

Species of orchid

Aa colombiana is a species of orchid in the genus Aa. It is found in Colombia and Ecuador at altitudes of 2900 to 4300 meters.
