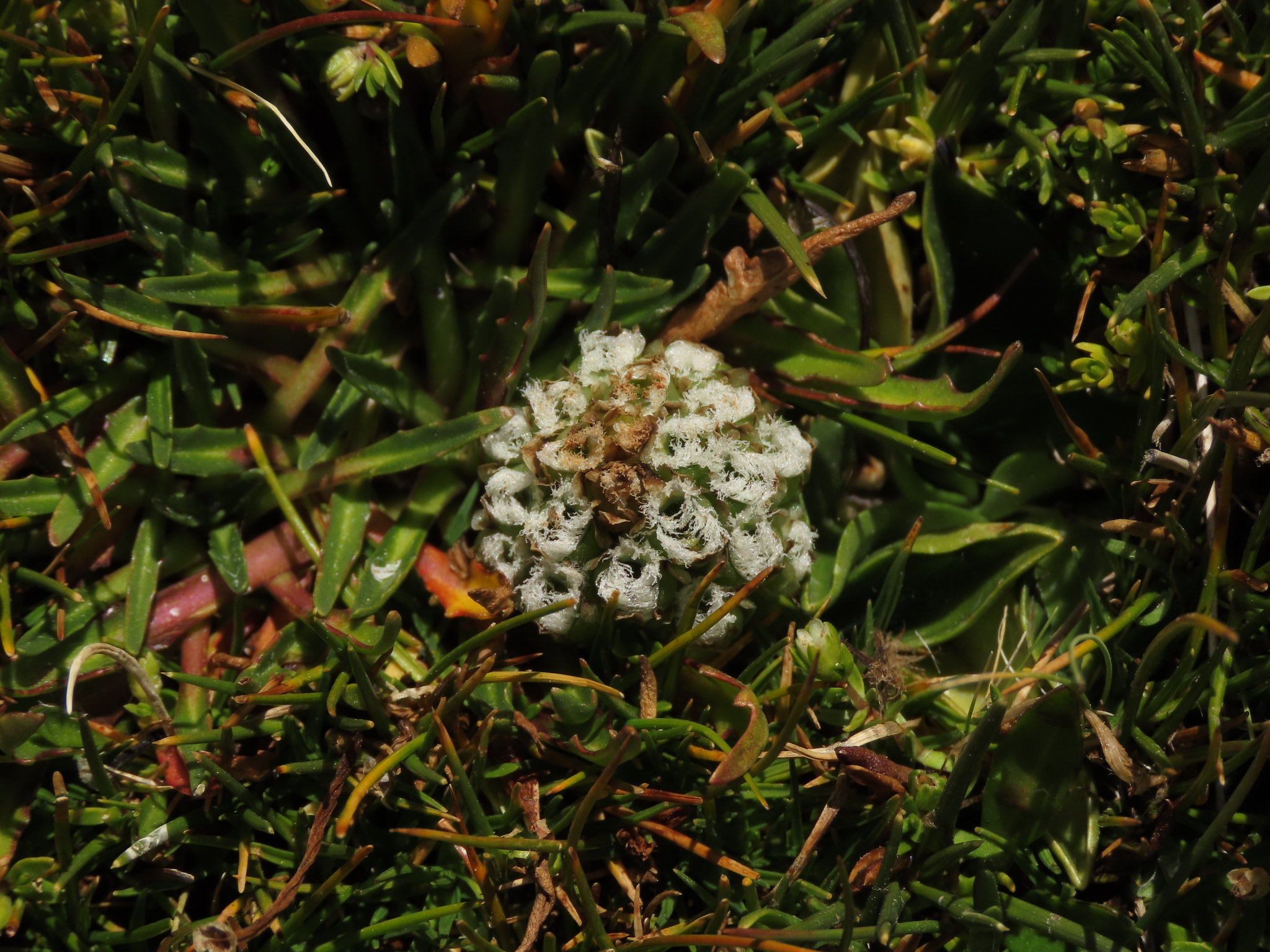

Scientific classification
- Kingdom: Plantae
- Clade: Tracheophytes
- Clade: Angiosperms
- Clade: Monocots
- Order: Asparagales
- Family: Orchidaceae
- Subfamily: Orchidoideae
- Tribe: Cranichideae
- Genus: Myrosmodes
- Species: M. nervosa

Binomial name
- Myrosmodes nervosa (Kraenzl.) Novoa, C.A.Vargas & Cisternas

Synonyms
- Aa nervosa (Kraenzl.) Schltr.; Altensteinia nervosa Kraenzl.

= Myrosmodes nervosa =

Species of orchid

Myrosmodes nervosa is a species of orchid in the genus Myrosmodes. It is endemic to northern Chile, where it is distributed from the Arica y Parinacota and Antofagasta regions.
