= Aa fiebrigii =

Scientific classification
- Kingdom: Plantae
- Clade: Tracheophytes
- Clade: Angiosperms
- Clade: Monocots
- Order: Asparagales
- Family: Orchidaceae
- Subfamily: Orchidoideae
- Tribe: Cranichideae
- Genus: Aa
- Species: A. fiebrigii

Binomial name
- Aa fiebrigii Schltr., 1912

Synonyms
- Altensteinia fiebrigii Schltr.

Species of orchid

Aa fiebrigii is a species of orchid in the genus Aa. It is found in Bolivia and northwest Argentina.
