= Aa erosa =

Scientific classification
- Kingdom: Plantae
- Clade: Tracheophytes
- Clade: Angiosperms
- Clade: Monocots
- Order: Asparagales
- Family: Orchidaceae
- Subfamily: Orchidoideae
- Tribe: Cranichideae
- Genus: Aa
- Species: A. erosa

Binomial name
- Aa erosa Schltr., 1912

Species of orchid

Aa erosa is a species of orchid in the genus Aa. It is endemic to Peru and blooms in late winter and early spring.

As a member of the Orchidaceae family, Aa erosa (synonymous to the name Altensteinia erosa) exhibits protandy based on anatomical observations. In plants, protandry occurs when the male reproductive structure releases pollen before the female parts can.

== Geographical range ==
The native range of this species is Peru. It is a tuberous geophyte and grows primarily in the subalpine or subarctic biome.
