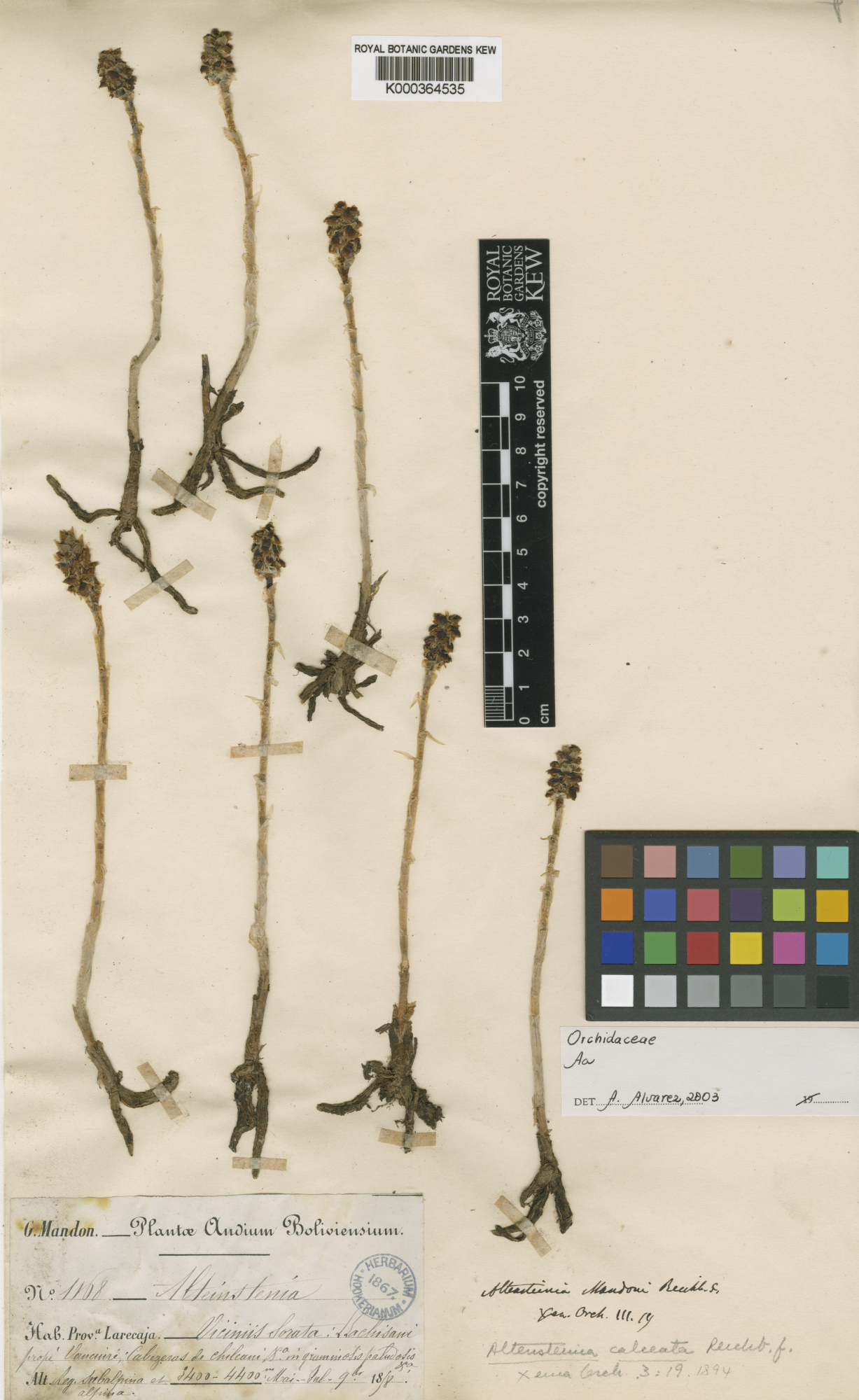

Conservation status
- Data Deficient (IUCN 3.1)

Scientific classification
- Kingdom: Plantae
- Clade: Tracheophytes
- Clade: Angiosperms
- Clade: Monocots
- Order: Asparagales
- Family: Orchidaceae
- Subfamily: Orchidoideae
- Tribe: Cranichideae
- Genus: Aa
- Species: A. calceata

Binomial name
- Aa calceata (Rchb.f.) Schltr.

Synonyms
- Altensteinia calceata Rchb.f.

= Aa calceata =

Species of orchid

Aa calceata (formerly Altensteinia calceata) is a species of terrestrial orchid in the genus Aa. It is thought to be endemic to Bolivia, though there are unconfirmed records of the plant in Peru.

== Description ==
Aa calceata is a terrestrial orchid that typically grows 13–57 cm (5.1–22.4 in) tall. The stem is smooth, and is almost entirely covered with tubular, hyaline, acute or acuminate sheaths. The orchid spike is loosely shaped like a cylinder, is densely covered with flowers, and is up to 4.8 cm (1.9 in) long.

The flowers are white, minute, and are mostly smooth. The dorsal sepals are ovate or oblong, acute, and are up to 2 mm long. The lateral sepals are noticeably longer, are oblong or ligulate, and are acute. The petals are oblong or linear, circinate, lightly falcate, and obtuse to acute. The uppermost lip is calceiform with the opening being denticulate or minutely fimbriate. Plants of this species lose most of its leaves when flowering.

== Distribution and habitat ==
Aa calceata has been recorded from a 12 km^{2} (4.6 sq mi) region in Bolivia, near Lake Titicaca. The species may also occur in Peru.

It grows in forests or grasslands at elevations of 3,000–4,500 m (9,800–14,800 ft) above sea level.

== Conservation ==
As of December 2024, the IUCN Red List listed Aa calceata as data deficient worldwide. This status was last assessed on 21 November 2018.

== Taxonomy ==
Aa calceata was first described by Heinrich Gustav Reichenbach under the name Altensteinia calceata in 1878 in the journal Xenia Orchidacea. In 1912, Friedrich Richard Rudolph Schlechter moved the species to the genus Aa, keeping the specific epithet the same.
