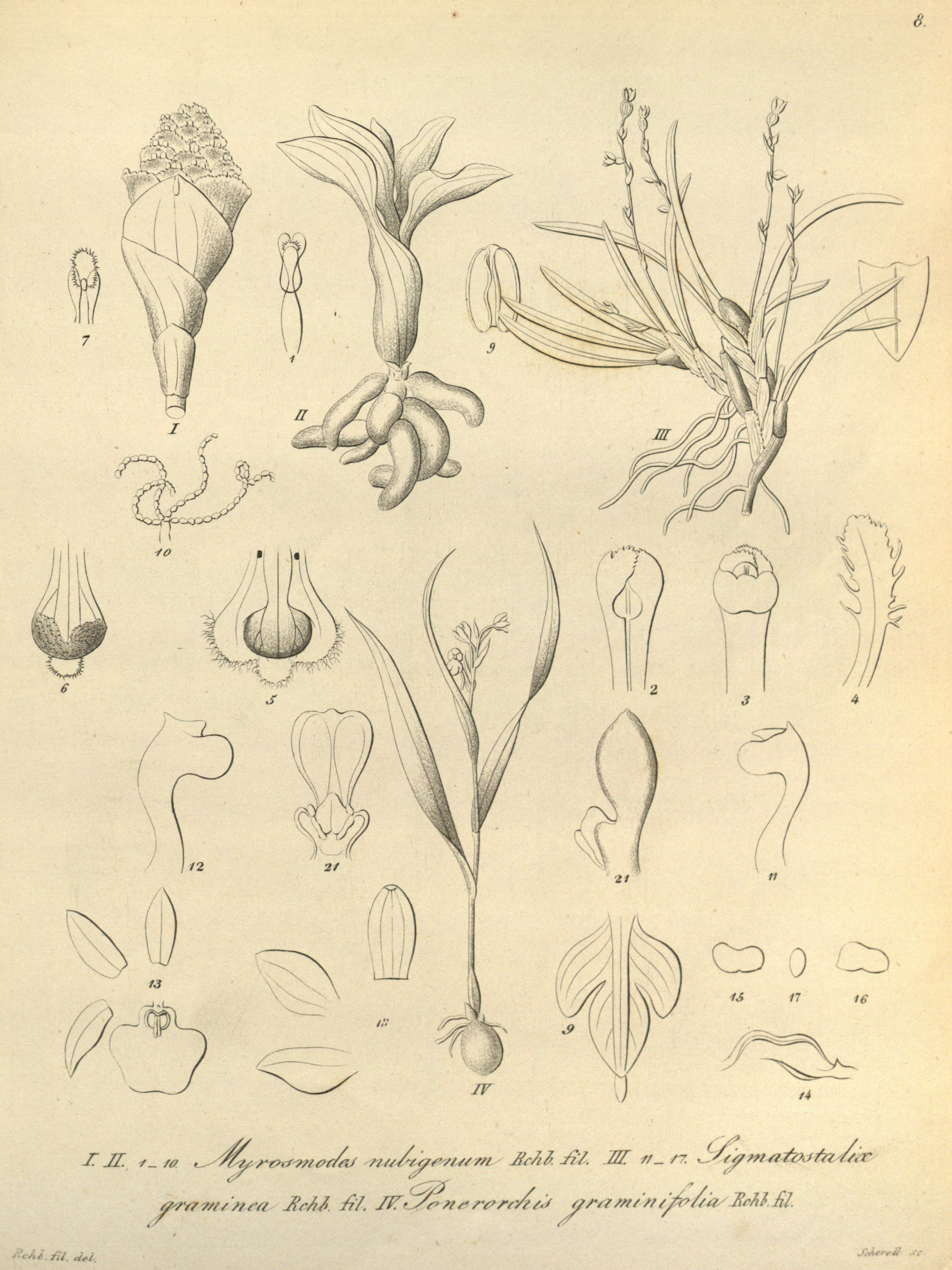

Scientific classification
- Kingdom: Plantae
- Clade: Tracheophytes
- Clade: Angiosperms
- Clade: Monocots
- Order: Asparagales
- Family: Orchidaceae
- Subfamily: Orchidoideae
- Tribe: Cranichideae
- Subtribe: Cranichidinae
- Genus: Myrosmodes; Rchb.f.

= Myrosmodes =

Genus of orchids

Myrosmodes is a genus of flowering plants from the family Orchidaceae, native to South America. As of December 2025, Plants of the World Online accepts the following 14 species:

- Myrosmodes brevis (Schltr.) Garay
- Myrosmodes chiogena (Schltr.) C.A.Vargas
- Myrosmodes cochlearis Garay
- Myrosmodes filamentosa (Mansf.) Garay
- Myrosmodes gymnandra (Rchb.f.) C.A.Vargas
- Myrosmodes nervosa (Kraenzl.) Novoa, C.A.Vargas & Cisternas
- Myrosmodes noemiae Monsalvo, M.I.Sánchez & Fortunato
- Myrosmodes nubigena Rchb.f.
- Myrosmodes paludosa (Rchb.f.) P.Ortiz
- Myrosmodes reticulata Szlach., Mytnik & S.Nowak
- Myrosmodes rhynchocarpa (Schltr.) Garay
- Myrosmodes rostrata (Rchb.f.) Garay
- Myrosmodes subnivalis Szlach., Mytnik & S.Nowak
- Myrosmodes ustulata (Schltr.) Garay
