= Aa aurantiaca =

Scientific classification
- Kingdom: Plantae
- Clade: Tracheophytes
- Clade: Angiosperms
- Clade: Monocots
- Order: Asparagales
- Family: Orchidaceae
- Subfamily: Orchidoideae
- Tribe: Cranichideae
- Genus: Aa
- Species: A. aurantiaca

Binomial name
- Aa aurantiaca D. Trujillo (2011)

Species of orchid

Aa aurantiaca is a species of terrestrial orchid in the genus Aa endemic to the Department of La Libertad in northwestern Peru. It was described by Delsy Trujillo in 2011.

== Description ==
Aa aurantiaca is a small, terrestrial orchid. The roots are fleshy, pubescent, and are in small clusters. The inflorescence is slender and erect, and is up to 30 cm long. The inflorescence is wrapped by up to 23 extremely thin, transparent sheaths. There is a densely many-flowered cylindrical spike 2.2–5 cm (0.87–1.97 in) at the end of each inflorescence.

The floral bracts are ovate, acute to obtuse, with slightly erose margins. The floral bracts are 4–5 mm long by 4 mm wide, and are somewhat longer than the flowers. The flowers are orange to a reddish orange, and are not resupinate. The dorsal sepals are 2 mm long by 1.3–1.5 mm wide, and are oblong to ovate, obtuse, and reflexed. The lateral sepals are 3 mm long by 1.5 mm wide, and are shortly connate at the base, obliquely oblong to lanceolate, obtuse, and somewhat keeled. Both the dorsal and lateral sepals have one nerve and dorsally hairy.

The petals are obliquely ovate lanceolate, obtuse, and reflexed and are up to 2.3 mm long by 1.1 mm wide. The lip is 2 mm long by 2.5 mm wide and shaped like a slipper, transversely elliptic, mostly fleshy, barely 3-lobed, and has a narrow opening.

== Distribution and habitat ==
Aa aurantiaca has only been recorded on grassy hillsides at elevations of 3,500–4,000 m (11,500–13,100 ft) above sea level in the La Libertad region in northwestern Peru.

== Ecology ==
Aa aurantiaca flowers between May and August. Some populations of this species occur alongside other Aa species.

== Taxonomy ==
Aa aurantiaca was first named and described by Delsy Trujillo in 2011 in the journal Lankesteriana. The species has no synonyms according to Plants of the World Online.

=== Etymology ===
The specific epithet, aurantiaca, is derived from the Latin word aurantiacus (meaning "orange", referring to the colour of the flowers).
