= Aa mandonii =

Conservation status
- Data Deficient (IUCN 3.1)

Scientific classification
- Kingdom: Plantae
- Clade: Tracheophytes
- Clade: Angiosperms
- Clade: Monocots
- Order: Asparagales
- Family: Orchidaceae
- Subfamily: Orchidoideae
- Tribe: Cranichideae
- Genus: Aa
- Species: A. mandonii

Binomial name
- Aa mandonii (Rchb.f.) Schltr., 1912

Synonyms
- Altensteinia mandonii Rchb.f.

Species of orchid

Aa mandonii is a species of orchid. It is endemic to Bolivia, although there are unconfirmed records of similar plants from Peru. It grows in Andean grasslands at elevations of 3,000–4,500 m (9,800–14,800 ft) above sea level.
