= Treatia =

Scientific classification
- Kingdom: Animalia
- Phylum: Arthropoda
- Subphylum: Chelicerata
- Class: Arachnida
- Order: Mesostigmata
- Family: Otopheidomenidae
- Genus: Treatia; Krantz & Khot, 1962

Genus of mites

Treatia is a genus of mites in the family Otopheidomenidae. There is at least one described species in Treatia, T. indica, found in India.
