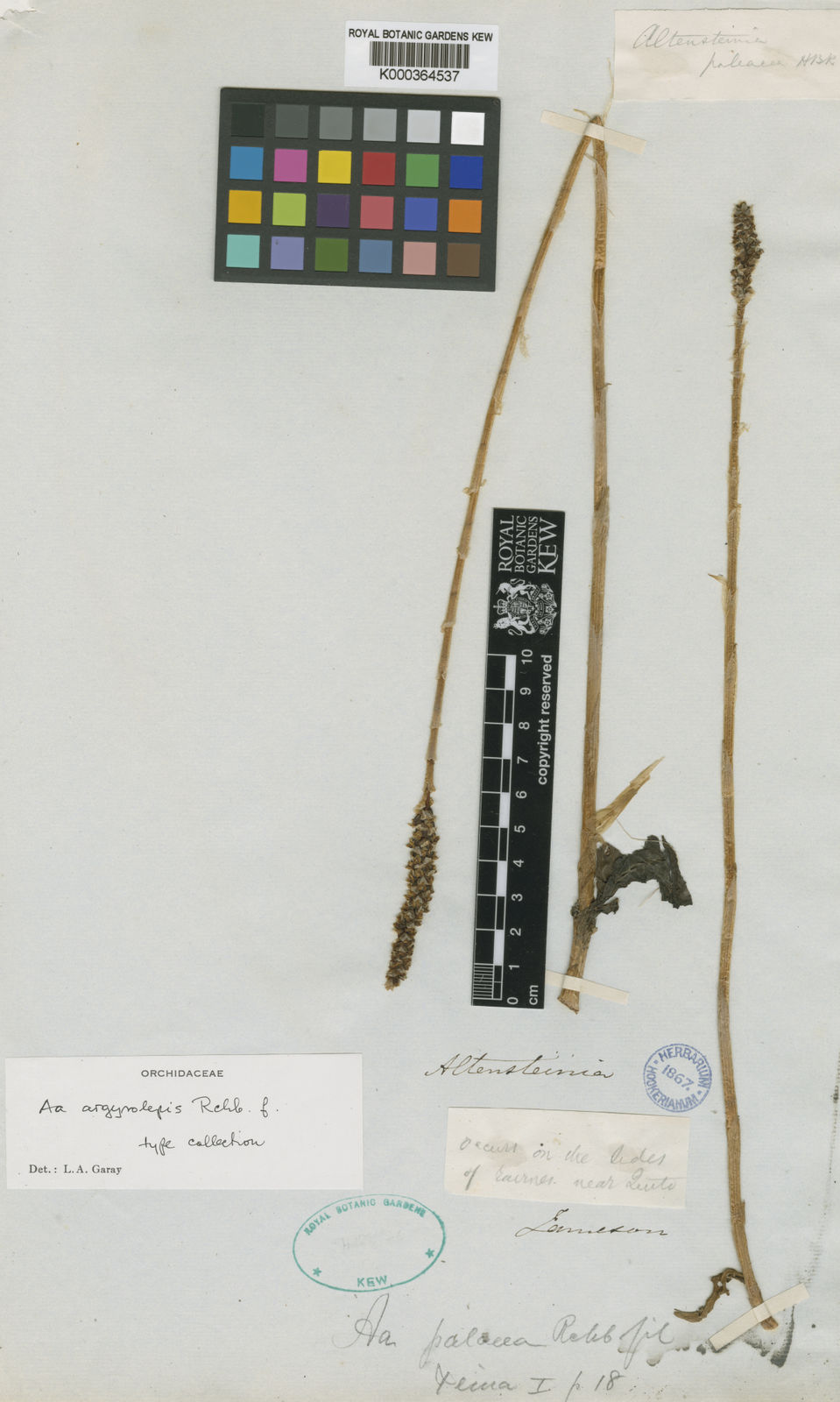
- specimen at the Royal Botanic Gardens, Kew

Scientific classification
- Kingdom: Plantae
- Clade: Tracheophytes
- Clade: Angiosperms
- Clade: Monocots
- Order: Asparagales
- Family: Orchidaceae
- Subfamily: Orchidoideae
- Tribe: Cranichideae
- Genus: Aa
- Species: A. argyrolepis

Binomial name
- Aa argyrolepis Rchb.f., 1854

Synonyms
- Altensteinia argyrolepis (Rchb.f.) Rchb.f.

= Aa argyrolepis =

Species of orchid

Aa argyrolepis is an orchid in the genus Aa. It grows at altitudes of 2,500 to 4,200 meters in Bolivia, Ecuador, Colombia and Peru.
