= Spirosomataceae =

Scientific classification
- Domain: Bacteria
- Kingdom: Pseudomonadati
- Phylum: Bacteroidota
- Class: Cytophagia
- Order: Cytophagales
- Family: Spirosomataceae corrig. Larkin and Borrall 1978 (Approved Lists 1980)

Genera
- See text

Synonyms
- Spirosomaceae

Family of bacteria

Spirosomataceae is a family of gram-negative bacteria in the phylum Bacteroidota. It was originally published with the spelling 'Spirosomaceae', but this was corrected in 1978.

== Genera ==
The family Spirosomataceae comprises the following genera:

- Aquirufa Pitt et al. 2019
- Arcicella Nikitin et al. 2004
- Arcticibacterium Li et al. 2017
- Arsenicibacter Huang et al. 2017
- Dyadobacter Chelius and Triplett 2000
- Emticicia Saha and Chakrabarti 2006
- Fibrella Filippini et al. 2011
- Fibrisoma Filippini et al. 2011
- Flectobacillus Larkin et al. 1977 (Approved Lists 1980)
- Fluviimonas Sheu et al. 2013
- Huanghella Jiang et al. 2013
- Jiulongibacter Liu et al. 2016
- Lacihabitans Joung et al. 2014
- Larkinella Vancanneyt et al. 2006
- Marinilongibacter Zhang et al. 2023
- Leadbetterella Weon et al. 2005
- Nibrella Kang et al. 2013
- Persicitalea Yoon et al. 2007
- Pseudarcicella Kämpfer et al. 2012
- Ravibacter Chaudhary et al. 2017
- Rhabdobacter Dahal and Kim 2016
- Rudanella Weon et al. 2008
- Runella Larkin and Williams 1978 (Approved Lists 1980)
- Siphonobacter Táncsics et al. 2010
- Spirosoma Migula 1894 (Approved Lists 1980)
- Taeseokella Joung et al. 2015
- Telluribacter Lee et al. 2017
