= Cyrea arrowi =

Scientific classification
- Kingdom: Animalia
- Phylum: Arthropoda
- Clade: Pancrustacea
- Class: Insecta
- Order: Coleoptera
- Suborder: Polyphaga
- Infraorder: Cucujiformia
- Family: Coccinellidae
- Genus: Cyrea
- Species: C. arrowi

Binomial name
- Cyrea arrowi (Brèthes, 1925)

Synonyms
- Hyperaspis arrowi Brèthes, 1925; Hyperaspis arrowi var. darwini Brèthes, 1925

Species of beetle

Cyrea arrowi is a species of beetle of the family Coccinellidae. It is found in Argentina and Uruguay.

== Description ==
Adults reach a length of about 2.3–3.0 mm. They have a yellow body. The pronotum has a large black spot. The elytron is black with two yellow markings.
