= Cyrea suturella =

Scientific classification
- Kingdom: Animalia
- Phylum: Arthropoda
- Clade: Pancrustacea
- Class: Insecta
- Order: Coleoptera
- Suborder: Polyphaga
- Infraorder: Cucujiformia
- Family: Coccinellidae
- Genus: Cyrea
- Species: C. suturella

Binomial name
- Cyrea suturella (Mulsant, 1853)

Synonyms
- Cleothera suturella Mulsant, 1853

Species of beetle

Cyrea suturella is a species of beetle of the family Coccinellidae. It is found in Brazil.

== Description ==
Adults reach a length of about 2.7 mm. They have a yellow body. The pronotum however, is mostly yellowish brown. The elytron has a dark brown suture.
