= Cyrea emmae =

Scientific classification
- Kingdom: Animalia
- Phylum: Arthropoda
- Clade: Pancrustacea
- Class: Insecta
- Order: Coleoptera
- Suborder: Polyphaga
- Infraorder: Cucujiformia
- Family: Coccinellidae
- Genus: Cyrea
- Species: C. emmae

Binomial name
- Cyrea emmae (Crotch, 1874)

Synonyms
- Hyperaspis emmae Crotch, 1874

Species of beetle

Cyrea emmae is a species of beetle of the family Coccinellidae. It is found in Brazil.

== Description ==
Adults reach a length of about 2.3 mm. They have a dark brown body, with a dark reddish brown area on the head. The pronotum has a yellow area. The elytron is yellow with a dark brown border.
