= Cyrea collaris =

Scientific classification
- Kingdom: Animalia
- Phylum: Arthropoda
- Clade: Pancrustacea
- Class: Insecta
- Order: Coleoptera
- Suborder: Polyphaga
- Infraorder: Cucujiformia
- Family: Coccinellidae
- Genus: Cyrea
- Species: C. collaris

Binomial name
- Cyrea collaris (Mulsant, 1850)

Synonyms
- Cleothera collaris Mulsant, 1850

Species of beetle

Cyrea collaris is a species of beetle of the family Coccinellidae. It is found in Colombia.

== Description ==
Adults reach a length of about 2.6–3.1 mm. They have a yellow body. The pronotum has a black spot. The elytron is black with five large yellow spots.
