= Cyrea novemsignata =

Scientific classification
- Kingdom: Animalia
- Phylum: Arthropoda
- Clade: Pancrustacea
- Class: Insecta
- Order: Coleoptera
- Suborder: Polyphaga
- Infraorder: Cucujiformia
- Family: Coccinellidae
- Genus: Cyrea
- Species: C. novemsignata

Binomial name
- Cyrea novemsignata (Herbst, 1793)

Synonyms
- Coccinella novemsignata Herbst, 1793; Cleothera triacantha Mulsant, 1850

Species of beetle

Cyrea novemsignata is a species of beetle of the family Coccinellidae. It is found in Brazil, Ecuador, Paraguay, Peru and Surinam.

== Description ==
Adults reach a length of about 3 mm. They have a yellow body. The pronotum has five small dark brown spots. The elytron is reddish yellow with five dark spots.
