= Cyrea andicola =

Scientific classification
- Kingdom: Animalia
- Phylum: Arthropoda
- Clade: Pancrustacea
- Class: Insecta
- Order: Coleoptera
- Suborder: Polyphaga
- Infraorder: Cucujiformia
- Family: Coccinellidae
- Genus: Cyrea
- Species: C. andicola

Binomial name
- Cyrea andicola (Kirsch, 1883)

Synonyms
- Hyperaspis (Cleothera) andicola Kirsch, 1883

Species of beetle

Cyrea andicola is a species of beetle of the family Coccinellidae. It is found in Colombia.

== Description ==
Adults reach a length of about 4.4–5 mm. They have a black body and yellow head. The pronotum is black except for a yellow border and a yellow triangular spot. The elytron has five large yellow spots.
