= Cyrea ferruginiceps =

Scientific classification
- Kingdom: Animalia
- Phylum: Arthropoda
- Clade: Pancrustacea
- Class: Insecta
- Order: Coleoptera
- Suborder: Polyphaga
- Infraorder: Cucujiformia
- Family: Coccinellidae
- Genus: Cyrea
- Species: C. ferruginiceps

Binomial name
- Cyrea ferruginiceps (Weise, 1905)

Synonyms
- Cleothera ferruginiceps Weise, 1905

Species of beetle

Cyrea ferruginiceps is a species of beetle of the family Coccinellidae. It is found in Argentina.

== Description ==
Adults reach a length of about 4.3–5.0 mm. They have a reddish yellow body. The pronotum has a large black spot. The elytron is black with five large yellow spots.
