= Cyrea exclamationis =

Scientific classification
- Kingdom: Animalia
- Phylum: Arthropoda
- Clade: Pancrustacea
- Class: Insecta
- Order: Coleoptera
- Suborder: Polyphaga
- Infraorder: Cucujiformia
- Family: Coccinellidae
- Genus: Cyrea
- Species: C. exclamationis

Binomial name
- Cyrea exclamationis (Mulsant, 1850)

Synonyms
- Hyperaspis exclamationis Mulsant, 1850

Species of beetle

Cyrea exclamationis is a species of beetle of the family Coccinellidae. It is found in Brazil.

== Description ==
Adults reach a length of about 1.9-2.7 mm. They have a yellow body. The pronotum is black with yellow borders. The elytron is black with two yellow spots.
