= Cyrea marian =

Scientific classification
- Kingdom: Animalia
- Phylum: Arthropoda
- Clade: Pancrustacea
- Class: Insecta
- Order: Coleoptera
- Suborder: Polyphaga
- Infraorder: Cucujiformia
- Family: Coccinellidae
- Genus: Cyrea
- Species: C. marian

Binomial name
- Cyrea marian Canepari & Gordon, 2016

Species of beetle

Cyrea marian is a species of beetle of the family Coccinellidae. It is found in Argentina.

== Description ==
Adults reach a length of about 3 mm. They have a yellow body and a yellowish red head and pronotum. The elytron has two dark brown markings.
