= Cyrea flavoguttata =

Scientific classification
- Kingdom: Animalia
- Phylum: Arthropoda
- Clade: Pancrustacea
- Class: Insecta
- Order: Coleoptera
- Suborder: Polyphaga
- Infraorder: Cucujiformia
- Family: Coccinellidae
- Genus: Cyrea
- Species: C. flavoguttata

Binomial name
- Cyrea flavoguttata (Mulsant, 1850)

Synonyms
- Hyperaspis flavoguttata Mulsant, 1850; Cleothera scapulata Mulsant, 1853; Cleothera mercabilis Mulsant, 1853; Hyperaspis iheringi Weise, 1910

Species of beetle

Cyrea flavoguttata is a species of beetle of the family Coccinellidae. It is found in Argentina, Brazil and Paraguay.

== Description ==
Adults reach a length of about 2.7–4.3 mm. They have a yellow body. The pronotum has a large black spot. The elytron is black with four large yellow spots.
