= Cyrea lydia =

Scientific classification
- Kingdom: Animalia
- Phylum: Arthropoda
- Clade: Pancrustacea
- Class: Insecta
- Order: Coleoptera
- Suborder: Polyphaga
- Infraorder: Cucujiformia
- Family: Coccinellidae
- Genus: Cyrea
- Species: C. lydia

Binomial name
- Cyrea lydia Canepari & Gordon, 2016

Species of beetle

Cyrea lydia is a species of beetle of the family Coccinellidae. It is found in Brazil.

== Description ==
Adults reach a length of about 2.4–2.9 mm. They have a yellow body with some brown markings on the head. The pronotum has a large dark brown spot. The elytron is dark brown with two yellow spots.
