= Cyrea viola =

Scientific classification
- Kingdom: Animalia
- Phylum: Arthropoda
- Clade: Pancrustacea
- Class: Insecta
- Order: Coleoptera
- Suborder: Polyphaga
- Infraorder: Cucujiformia
- Family: Coccinellidae
- Genus: Cyrea
- Species: C. viola

Binomial name
- Cyrea viola Canepari & Gordon, 2016

Species of beetle

Cyrea viola is a species of beetle of the family Coccinellidae. It is found in Colombia.

== Description ==
Adults reach a length of about 3.7 mm. They have a yellow body. The pronotum is black with a large yellow spot in the form of a diamond. The elytron is black with three yellow markings.
