= Cyrea moritzi =

Scientific classification
- Kingdom: Animalia
- Phylum: Arthropoda
- Clade: Pancrustacea
- Class: Insecta
- Order: Coleoptera
- Suborder: Polyphaga
- Infraorder: Cucujiformia
- Family: Coccinellidae
- Genus: Cyrea
- Species: C. moritzi

Binomial name
- Cyrea moritzi (Mader, 1954)

Synonyms
- Hyperaspis moritzi Mader, 1954

Species of beetle

Cyrea moritzi is a species of beetle of the family Coccinellidae. It is found in Venezuela.

== Description ==
Adults reach a length of about 2.6 mm. They have a yellow body. The pronotum has a black area. The elytron has a black border and five small black spots.
