= Cyrea tessulata =

Scientific classification
- Kingdom: Animalia
- Phylum: Arthropoda
- Clade: Pancrustacea
- Class: Insecta
- Order: Coleoptera
- Suborder: Polyphaga
- Infraorder: Cucujiformia
- Family: Coccinellidae
- Genus: Cyrea
- Species: C. tessulata

Binomial name
- Cyrea tessulata (Mulsant, 1850)

Synonyms
- Cleothera tessulata Mulsant, 1850; Cleothera schaufussi Vogel, 1865; Hyperaspis adelaida Gorham, 1894

Species of beetle

Cyrea tessulata is a species of beetle of the family Coccinellidae. It is found in Colombia.

== Description ==
Adults reach a length of about 2.5–3.0 mm. They have a yellow body. The pronotum has four brown spots. The elytron has seven small brown spots.
