= Cyrea victoriae =

Scientific classification
- Kingdom: Animalia
- Phylum: Arthropoda
- Clade: Pancrustacea
- Class: Insecta
- Order: Coleoptera
- Suborder: Polyphaga
- Infraorder: Cucujiformia
- Family: Coccinellidae
- Genus: Cyrea
- Species: C. victoriae

Binomial name
- Cyrea victoriae (Crotch, 1874)

Synonyms
- Hyperaspis victoria Crotch, 1874

Species of beetle

Cyrea victoriae is a species of beetle of the family Coccinellidae. It is found in Brazil, French Guiana, Guyana and Trinidad.

== Description ==
Adults reach a length of about 3.2-3.6 mm. They have a reddish yellow body. The elytron is black with three yellow spots.
