= Cyrea quinquenotata =

Scientific classification
- Kingdom: Animalia
- Phylum: Arthropoda
- Clade: Pancrustacea
- Class: Insecta
- Order: Coleoptera
- Suborder: Polyphaga
- Infraorder: Cucujiformia
- Family: Coccinellidae
- Genus: Cyrea
- Species: C. quinquenotata

Binomial name
- Cyrea quinquenotata (Mulsant, 1850)

Synonyms
- Cleothera quinquenotata Mulsant, 1850; Cleothera sexnotata Brèthes, 1925

Species of beetle

Cyrea quinquenotata is a species of beetle of the family Coccinellidae. It is found in Brazil and Surinam.

== Description ==
Adults reach a length of about 2.4–3.2 mm. They have a yellow body. The pronotum has three dark brown spots. The elytron is reddish yellow with a dark brown border and three small spots.
