= Cyrea castelnaudii =

Scientific classification
- Kingdom: Animalia
- Phylum: Arthropoda
- Clade: Pancrustacea
- Class: Insecta
- Order: Coleoptera
- Suborder: Polyphaga
- Infraorder: Cucujiformia
- Family: Coccinellidae
- Genus: Cyrea
- Species: C. castelnaudii

Binomial name
- Cyrea castelnaudii (Mulsant, 1850)

Synonyms
- Cleothera castelnaudii Mulsant, 1850

Species of beetle

Cyrea castelnaudii is a species of beetle of the family Coccinellidae. It is found in Brazil.

== Description ==
Adults reach a length of about 2.2 mm. They have a dark brown body. The pronotum is however, is reddish brown. The elytron is light brownish yellow with one large dark brown spot.
