= Cyrea napoensis =

Scientific classification
- Kingdom: Animalia
- Phylum: Arthropoda
- Clade: Pancrustacea
- Class: Insecta
- Order: Coleoptera
- Suborder: Polyphaga
- Infraorder: Cucujiformia
- Family: Coccinellidae
- Genus: Cyrea
- Species: C. napoensis

Binomial name
- Cyrea napoensis González & Větrovec, 2021

Species of beetle

Cyrea napoensis is a species of beetle of the family Coccinellidae. It is found in Ecuador.

== Description ==
Adults reach a length of about 3.3 mm (0.13 in). The head and antennae are yellow. The pronotum is yellow with a black basal stripe. The scutellum is black and the elytra are yellow with a black humeral spot and a second smaller spot, a black sutural stripe and a black lateral border. The ventral surface is yellow, but the abdomen is black. The legs are mostly yellow.

== Etymology ==
The species name refers to the province of Napo, where the holotype was found.
