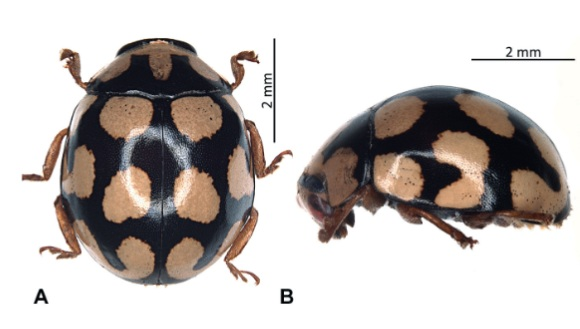

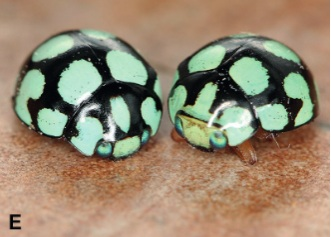

Scientific classification
- Kingdom: Animalia
- Phylum: Arthropoda
- Clade: Pancrustacea
- Class: Insecta
- Order: Coleoptera
- Suborder: Polyphaga
- Infraorder: Cucujiformia
- Family: Coccinellidae
- Genus: Cyrea
- Species: C. mcclarini

Binomial name
- Cyrea mcclarini Szawaryn & Czerwiński, 2022

= Cyrea mcclarini =

Species of beetle

Cyrea mcclarini is a species of beetle of the family Coccinellidae. It is found in Ecuador (Napo).

== Description ==
Adults reach a length of about 5 mm. They have a distinctive dorsal elytral pattern rarely found in ladybird beetles, with a turquoise colored maculae in living specimens. In dried specimens the turquoise color disappears and the maculae become yellow. However, the unique double C pattern on each elytron distinguish this species from all other known species.

== Etymology ==
The species is named in honour of Jim McClarin from Consanga, Napo, Ecuador, who kindly images of living specimens to the authors.
