= Cyrea noticollis =

Scientific classification
- Kingdom: Animalia
- Phylum: Arthropoda
- Clade: Pancrustacea
- Class: Insecta
- Order: Coleoptera
- Suborder: Polyphaga
- Infraorder: Cucujiformia
- Family: Coccinellidae
- Genus: Cyrea
- Species: C. noticollis

Binomial name
- Cyrea noticollis (Mulsant, 1850)

Synonyms
- Cleothera noticollis Mulsant, 1850

Species of beetle

Cyrea noticollis is a species of beetle of the family Coccinellidae. It is found in Ecuador, Colombia, Peru and Venezuela.

== Description ==
Adults reach a length of about 2.4–3.0 mm. They have a yellow body. The pronotum has some dark brown spots. The elytron has dark brown borders and four dark brown spots.
