= Cyrea octupla =

Scientific classification
- Kingdom: Animalia
- Phylum: Arthropoda
- Clade: Pancrustacea
- Class: Insecta
- Order: Coleoptera
- Suborder: Polyphaga
- Infraorder: Cucujiformia
- Family: Coccinellidae
- Genus: Cyrea
- Species: C. octupla

Binomial name
- Cyrea octupla (Mulsant, 1853)

Synonyms
- Cleothera octupla Mulsant, 1853

Species of beetle

Cyrea octupla is a species of beetle of the family Coccinellidae. It is found in Brazil.

== Description ==
Adults reach a length of about 3 mm. They have a yellow body, while the head is partly dark brown. The pronotum is dark brown with a yellow border. The elytron has a dark brown border and four large brown spots.
