= Cyrea dolores =

Scientific classification
- Kingdom: Animalia
- Phylum: Arthropoda
- Clade: Pancrustacea
- Class: Insecta
- Order: Coleoptera
- Suborder: Polyphaga
- Infraorder: Cucujiformia
- Family: Coccinellidae
- Genus: Cyrea
- Species: C. dolores

Binomial name
- Cyrea dolores Canepari & Gordon, 2016

Species of beetle

Cyrea dolores is a species of beetle of the family Coccinellidae. It is found in Brazil.

== Description ==
Adults reach a length of about 2.6 mm. They have a reddish yellow body. The pronotum is mostly black with some areas yellow and with three small yellow spots. The elytron is reddish yellow with black borders.
