= Cyrea melanie =

Scientific classification
- Kingdom: Animalia
- Phylum: Arthropoda
- Clade: Pancrustacea
- Class: Insecta
- Order: Coleoptera
- Suborder: Polyphaga
- Infraorder: Cucujiformia
- Family: Coccinellidae
- Genus: Cyrea
- Species: C. melanie

Binomial name
- Cyrea melanie Canepari & Gordon, 2016

Species of beetle

Cyrea melanie is a species of beetle of the family Coccinellidae. It is found in Brazil.

== Description ==
Adults reach a length of about 2.7 mm. They have a yellow body. The pronotum with a brown spot. The elytron has four brown spots.
