= Cyrea constance =

Scientific classification
- Kingdom: Animalia
- Phylum: Arthropoda
- Clade: Pancrustacea
- Class: Insecta
- Order: Coleoptera
- Suborder: Polyphaga
- Infraorder: Cucujiformia
- Family: Coccinellidae
- Genus: Cyrea
- Species: C. constance

Binomial name
- Cyrea constance Canepari & Gordon, 2016

Species of beetle

Cyrea constance is a species of beetle of the Coccinellidae family. It is found in Brazil.

== Description ==
Adults reach a length of about 3 mm. They have a yellow body. The elytron is black with three large yellow spots.
