= Cyrea beatrice =

Scientific classification
- Kingdom: Animalia
- Phylum: Arthropoda
- Clade: Pancrustacea
- Class: Insecta
- Order: Coleoptera
- Suborder: Polyphaga
- Infraorder: Cucujiformia
- Family: Coccinellidae
- Genus: Cyrea
- Species: C. beatrice

Binomial name
- Cyrea beatrice Canepari & Gordon, 2016

Species of beetle

Cyrea beatrice is a species of beetle of the family Coccinellidae. It is found in Brazil.

== Description ==
Adults reach a length of about 2.8 mm. They have a dark brown body. The pronotum has a black spot. The elytron is yellow with black borders and a black spot.
