= Cyrea lucy =

Scientific classification
- Kingdom: Animalia
- Phylum: Arthropoda
- Clade: Pancrustacea
- Class: Insecta
- Order: Coleoptera
- Suborder: Polyphaga
- Infraorder: Cucujiformia
- Family: Coccinellidae
- Genus: Cyrea
- Species: C. lucy

Binomial name
- Cyrea lucy Canepari & Gordon, 2016

Species of beetle

Cyrea lucy is a species of beetle of the family Coccinellidae. It is found in Uruguay.

== Description ==
Adults reach a length of about 3.8 mm. They have a reddish yellow body, but the elytron is yellow, bordered with black.
