= Cyrea trepida =

Scientific classification
- Kingdom: Animalia
- Phylum: Arthropoda
- Clade: Pancrustacea
- Class: Insecta
- Order: Coleoptera
- Suborder: Polyphaga
- Infraorder: Cucujiformia
- Family: Coccinellidae
- Genus: Cyrea
- Species: C. trepida

Binomial name
- Cyrea trepida (Mulsant, 1850)

Synonyms
- Cleothera trepida Mulsant, 1850

Species of beetle

Cyrea trepida is a species of beetle of the family Coccinellidae. It is found in Colombia, Surinam, Trinidad and Venezuela.

== Description ==
Adults reach a length of about 2.4-2.8 mm. They have a yellow body. The pronotum has a dark brown spot, as well as a triangular spot. The elytron has dark brown border and four large, dark brown spots.
