= Cyrea lillie =

Scientific classification
- Kingdom: Animalia
- Phylum: Arthropoda
- Clade: Pancrustacea
- Class: Insecta
- Order: Coleoptera
- Suborder: Polyphaga
- Infraorder: Cucujiformia
- Family: Coccinellidae
- Genus: Cyrea
- Species: C. lillie

Binomial name
- Cyrea lillie Canepari & Gordon, 2016

Species of beetle

Cyrea lillie is a species of beetle of the Coccinellidae family. It is found in Colombia.

== Description ==
Adults reach a length of about 2.6 mm. They have a yellowish red body, with some small brown spots on the head. The pronotum has a brown spot. The elytron is black with a yellowish red spot.
