= Cyrea jeanne =

Scientific classification
- Kingdom: Animalia
- Phylum: Arthropoda
- Clade: Pancrustacea
- Class: Insecta
- Order: Coleoptera
- Suborder: Polyphaga
- Infraorder: Cucujiformia
- Family: Coccinellidae
- Genus: Cyrea
- Species: C. jeanne

Binomial name
- Cyrea jeanne Canepari & Gordon, 2016

Species of beetle

Cyrea jeanne is a species of beetle of the family Coccinellidae. It is found in Colombia.

== Description ==
Adults reach a length of about 2.4-2.7 mm. They have a yellow body. The pronotum has one short brown spot and two comma shaped spots. The elytron is yellow with five large oval yellow spots.
