= Cyrea stacy =

Scientific classification
- Kingdom: Animalia
- Phylum: Arthropoda
- Clade: Pancrustacea
- Class: Insecta
- Order: Coleoptera
- Suborder: Polyphaga
- Infraorder: Cucujiformia
- Family: Coccinellidae
- Genus: Cyrea
- Species: C. stacy

Binomial name
- Cyrea stacy Canepari & Gordon, 2016

Species of beetle

Cyrea stacy is a species of beetle of the family Coccinellidae. It is found in Bolivia.

== Description ==
Adults reach a length of about 2.8 mm. They have a yellow body. The pronotum has five small dark brown spots. The elytron has four small, round dark brown spots.
