= Cyrea serval =

Scientific classification
- Kingdom: Animalia
- Phylum: Arthropoda
- Clade: Pancrustacea
- Class: Insecta
- Order: Coleoptera
- Suborder: Polyphaga
- Infraorder: Cucujiformia
- Family: Coccinellidae
- Genus: Cyrea
- Species: C. serval

Binomial name
- Cyrea serval (Mulsant, 1850)

Synonyms
- Cleothera serval Mulsant, 1850

Species of beetle

Cyrea serval is a species of beetle of the family Coccinellidae. It is found in French Guiana.

== Description ==
Adults reach a length of about 2.2 mm. They have a yellow body. The pronotum has a dark brown spot. The elytron has five yellow spots.
