= Cyrea lucille =

Scientific classification
- Kingdom: Animalia
- Phylum: Arthropoda
- Clade: Pancrustacea
- Class: Insecta
- Order: Coleoptera
- Suborder: Polyphaga
- Infraorder: Cucujiformia
- Family: Coccinellidae
- Genus: Cyrea
- Species: C. lucille

Binomial name
- Cyrea lucille Canepari & Gordon, 2016

Species of beetle

Cyrea lucille is a species of beetle of the family Coccinellidae. It is found in Argentina.

== Description ==
Adults reach a length of about 2.4–2.8 mm. They have a yellow body. The pronotum has a large black spot. The elytron is black with four large yellow spots.
