= Cyrea renifera =

Scientific classification
- Kingdom: Animalia
- Phylum: Arthropoda
- Clade: Pancrustacea
- Class: Insecta
- Order: Coleoptera
- Suborder: Polyphaga
- Infraorder: Cucujiformia
- Family: Coccinellidae
- Genus: Cyrea
- Species: C. renifera

Binomial name
- Cyrea renifera (Kirsch, 1876)

Synonyms
- Cleothera renifera Kirsch, 1876

Species of beetle

Cyrea renifera is a species of beetle of the family Coccinellidae. It is found in Brazil and Peru.

== Description ==
Adults reach a length of about 3.0–3.1 mm. They have a yellow body. The pronotum has three black spots. The elytron has brown borders and four small brown spots.
