= Cyrea ornaticollis =

Scientific classification
- Kingdom: Animalia
- Phylum: Arthropoda
- Clade: Pancrustacea
- Class: Insecta
- Order: Coleoptera
- Suborder: Polyphaga
- Infraorder: Cucujiformia
- Family: Coccinellidae
- Genus: Cyrea
- Species: C. ornaticollis

Binomial name
- Cyrea ornaticollis (Weise, 1902)

Synonyms
- Cleothera ornaticollis Weise, 1902

Species of beetle

Cyrea ornaticollis is a species of beetle of the family Coccinellidae. It is found in Venezuela.

== Description ==
Adults reach a length of about 2.4–3.0 mm. They have a yellow body. The pronotum has three black spots, two of which are comma shaped. The elytron has black borders and four black spots.
