= Cyrea arlene =

Scientific classification
- Kingdom: Animalia
- Phylum: Arthropoda
- Clade: Pancrustacea
- Class: Insecta
- Order: Coleoptera
- Suborder: Polyphaga
- Infraorder: Cucujiformia
- Family: Coccinellidae
- Genus: Cyrea
- Species: C. arlene

Binomial name
- Cyrea arlene Canepari & Gordon, 2016

Species of beetle

Cyrea arlene is a species of beetle of the family Coccinellidae. It is found in Colombia.

== Description ==
Adults reach a length of about 2.4 mm. They have a yellow body. The pronotum has a pale brown spot. The elytron is pale yellowish brown with six vague yellow spots.
