= Cyrea vicki =

Scientific classification
- Kingdom: Animalia
- Phylum: Arthropoda
- Clade: Pancrustacea
- Class: Insecta
- Order: Coleoptera
- Suborder: Polyphaga
- Infraorder: Cucujiformia
- Family: Coccinellidae
- Genus: Cyrea
- Species: C. vicki

Binomial name
- Cyrea vicki Canepari & Gordon, 2016

Species of beetle

Cyrea vicki is a species of beetle of the family Coccinellidae. It is found in Ecuador.

== Description ==
Adults reach a length of about 3 mm. They have a yellow body and a black head. The pronotum has a black spot. The elytron is black with four large yellow spots.
