= Cyrea yvonne =

Scientific classification
- Kingdom: Animalia
- Phylum: Arthropoda
- Clade: Pancrustacea
- Class: Insecta
- Order: Coleoptera
- Suborder: Polyphaga
- Infraorder: Cucujiformia
- Family: Coccinellidae
- Genus: Cyrea
- Species: C. yvonne

Binomial name
- Cyrea yvonne Canepari & Gordon, 2016

Species of beetle

Cyrea yvonne is a species of beetle of the family Coccinellidae. It is found in Brazil.

== Description ==
Adults reach a length of about 2.8–3 mm. They have a yellowish red body. The pronotum has a vague marking in the form of the letter M. The elytron has a vague yellow border.
