= Cyrea nigripennis =

Scientific classification
- Kingdom: Animalia
- Phylum: Arthropoda
- Clade: Pancrustacea
- Class: Insecta
- Order: Coleoptera
- Suborder: Polyphaga
- Infraorder: Cucujiformia
- Family: Coccinellidae
- Genus: Cyrea
- Species: C. nigripennis

Binomial name
- Cyrea nigripennis (Brèthes, 1925)

Synonyms
- Cleothera nigripennis Brèthes, 1925

Species of beetle

Cyrea nigripennis is a species of beetle of the family Coccinellidae. It is found in Brazil.

== Description ==
Adults reach a length of about 2.7 mm. They have a yellow body. The pronotum has a large bluish black spot. The elytron is bluish black.
