= Cyrea maculosa =

Scientific classification
- Kingdom: Animalia
- Phylum: Arthropoda
- Clade: Pancrustacea
- Class: Insecta
- Order: Coleoptera
- Suborder: Polyphaga
- Infraorder: Cucujiformia
- Family: Coccinellidae
- Genus: Cyrea
- Species: C. maculosa

Binomial name
- Cyrea maculosa (Mulsant, 1850)

Synonyms
- Cleothera maculosa Mulsant, 1850

Species of beetle

Cyrea maculosa is a species of beetle of the family Coccinellidae. It is found in Colombia.

== Description ==
Adults reach a length of about 2.5-2.7 mm. They have a yellow body. The pronotum has seven spots. The elytron has a brown border and seven large brown spots.
