= Cyrea mariae =

Scientific classification
- Kingdom: Animalia
- Phylum: Arthropoda
- Clade: Pancrustacea
- Class: Insecta
- Order: Coleoptera
- Suborder: Polyphaga
- Infraorder: Cucujiformia
- Family: Coccinellidae
- Genus: Cyrea
- Species: C. mariae

Binomial name
- Cyrea mariae (Crotch, 1874)

Synonyms
- Hyperaspis mariae Crotch, 1874

Species of beetle

Cyrea mariae is a species of beetle of the family Coccinellidae. It is found in Colombia.

== Description ==
Adults reach a length of about 2.8 mm. They have a yellow body. The pronotum has five dark brown spots. The elytron has a brown border and seven brown spots.
