= Cyrea crotchi =

Scientific classification
- Kingdom: Animalia
- Phylum: Arthropoda
- Clade: Pancrustacea
- Class: Insecta
- Order: Coleoptera
- Suborder: Polyphaga
- Infraorder: Cucujiformia
- Family: Coccinellidae
- Genus: Cyrea
- Species: C. crotchi

Binomial name
- Cyrea crotchi (Harold, 1875)

Synonyms
- Hyperapis crotchi Harold, 1875; Hyperaspis carolinae Crotch, 1874

Species of beetle

Cyrea crotchi is a species of beetle of the family Coccinellidae. It is found in Brazil.

== Description ==
Adults reach a length of about 3.3-3.8 mm. They have a yellow body. The pronotum has a black spot. The elytron is black with two yellow spots.
