= Cyrea bessie =

Scientific classification
- Kingdom: Animalia
- Phylum: Arthropoda
- Clade: Pancrustacea
- Class: Insecta
- Order: Coleoptera
- Suborder: Polyphaga
- Infraorder: Cucujiformia
- Family: Coccinellidae
- Genus: Cyrea
- Species: C. bessie

Binomial name
- Cyrea bessie Canepari & Gordon, 2016

Species of beetle

Cyrea bessie is a species of beetle of the family Coccinellidae. It is found in Brazil.

== Description ==
Adults reach a length of about 2-2.4 mm. They have a yellow body. The pronotum has a light brown spot and a small obscure rounded spot. The elytron is pale brown with five large yellow spots.
