= Cyrea petropolitana =

Scientific classification
- Kingdom: Animalia
- Phylum: Arthropoda
- Clade: Pancrustacea
- Class: Insecta
- Order: Coleoptera
- Suborder: Polyphaga
- Infraorder: Cucujiformia
- Family: Coccinellidae
- Genus: Cyrea
- Species: C. petropolitana

Binomial name
- Cyrea petropolitana (Crotch, 1874)

Synonyms
- Hyperaspis petropolitana Crotch, 1874

Species of beetle

Cyrea petropolitana is a species of beetle of the family Coccinellidae. It is found in Brazil.

== Description ==
Adults reach a length of about 2.2 mm. They have a dark brown body. The pronotum is yellow for the lateral one-third. The elytron has two yellow spots.
