= Cyrea gertrude =

Scientific classification
- Kingdom: Animalia
- Phylum: Arthropoda
- Clade: Pancrustacea
- Class: Insecta
- Order: Coleoptera
- Suborder: Polyphaga
- Infraorder: Cucujiformia
- Family: Coccinellidae
- Genus: Cyrea
- Species: C. gertrude

Binomial name
- Cyrea gertrude Canepari & Gordon, 2016

Species of beetle

Cyrea gertrude is a species of beetle of the family Coccinellidae. It is found in Colombia.

== Description ==
Adults reach a length of about 2.8 mm (0.11 in). They have a yellow body. The pronotum has a small black spot. The elytron is dark brown to almost black with five small yellow spots.
