= Cyrea =

Scientific classification
- Kingdom: Animalia
- Phylum: Arthropoda
- Clade: Pancrustacea
- Class: Insecta
- Order: Coleoptera
- Suborder: Polyphaga
- Infraorder: Cucujiformia
- Family: Coccinellidae
- Subfamily: Coccinellinae
- Tribe: Brachiacanthini
- Genus: Cyrea; Gordon & Canepari, 2013

Genus of beetles

Cyrea is a genus of lady beetles in the family Coccinellidae.

== Species ==
- tredecimguttata group
  - Cyrea mattie Canepari & Gordon, 2016
  - Cyrea ida Canepari & Gordon, 2016
  - Cyrea tredecimguttata (Mulsant, 1850)
  - Cyrea andicola (Kirsch, 1883)
  - Cyrea jo Canepari & Gordon, 2016
  - Cyrea eileen Canepari & Gordon, 2016
  - Cyrea gertrude Canepari & Gordon, 2016
  - Cyrea glenda Canepari & Gordon, 2016
  - Cyrea viola Canepari & Gordon, 2016
  - Cyrea melaneura (Mulsant, 1850)
  - Cyrea constantini González, 2022
- emiliae group
  - Cyrea emiliae (Crotch, 1874)
  - Cyrea annette Canepari & Gordon, 2016
  - Cyrea trepida (Mulsant, 1850)
  - Cyrea vivian Canepari & Gordon, 2016
  - Cyrea roberta Canepari & Gordon, 2016
  - Cyrea melanie Canepari & Gordon, 2016
  - Cyrea holly Canepari & Gordon, 2016
  - Cyrea brittany Canepari & Gordon, 2016
  - Cyrea maculosa (Mulsant, 1850)
  - Cyrea mariae (Crotch, 1874)
  - Cyrea gacognii (Mulsant, 1850)
  - Cyrea pearl Canepari & Gordon, 2016
  - Cyrea arlene Canepari & Gordon, 2016
  - Cyrea maureen Canepari & Gordon, 2016
  - Cyrea colleen Canepari & Gordon, 2016
  - Cyrea crotchi (Harold, 1875)
  - Cyrea compta (Mulsant, 1850)
  - Cyrea stella Canepari & Gordon, 2016
  - Cyrea faillei González, 2022
  - Cyrea arcayae González, 2022
- hexastigma group
  - Cyrea june Canepari & Gordon, 2016
  - Cyrea hexastigma (Mulsant, 1850)
  - Cyrea natalia Canepari & Gordon, 2016
  - Cyrea vera Canepari & Gordon, 2016
  - Cyrea agnes Canepari & Gordon, 2016
  - Cyrea willie Canepari & Gordon, 2016
  - Cyrea charlene Canepari & Gordon, 2016
  - Cyrea bessie Canepari & Gordon, 2016
  - Cyrea serval (Mulsant, 1850)
  - Cyrea lydia Canepari & Gordon, 2016
  - Cyrea yvonne Canepari & Gordon, 2016
  - Cyrea renee Canepari & Gordon, 2016
- devillii group
  - Cyrea bernice Canepari & Gordon, 2016
  - Cyrea audrey Canepari & Gordon, 2016
  - Cyrea devillii (Mulsant, 1850)
  - Cyrea yolanda Canepari & Gordon, 2016
  - Cyrea jeannette Canepari & Gordon, 2016
  - Cyrea ella Canepari & Gordon, 2016
  - Cyrea terry Canepari & Gordon, 2016
  - Cyrea wilma Canepari & Gordon, 2016
  - Cyrea gina Canepari & Gordon, 2016
  - Cyrea maxine Canepari & Gordon, 2016
  - Cyrea jessie Canepari & Gordon, 2016
  - Cyrea minnie Canepari & Gordon, 2016
  - Cyrea claudia Canepari & Gordon, 2016
  - Cyrea jackie Canepari & Gordon, 2016
  - Cyrea victoriae (Crotch, 1874)
  - Cyrea marcia Canepari & Gordon, 2016
  - Cyrea tanya Canepari & Gordon, 2016
  - Cyrea nellie Canepari & Gordon, 2016
  - Cyrea marlene Canepari & Gordon, 2016
  - Cyrea heidi Canepari & Gordon, 2016
  - Cyrea januarii (Brèthes, 1925)
  - Cyrea spinalis (Mulsant, 1853)
  - Cyrea similaris (Mader, 1957)
  - Cyrea petropolitana (Crotch, 1874)
  - Cyrea castelnaudii (Mulsant, 1850)
- tessulata group
  - Cyrea beatrice Canepari & Gordon, 2016
  - Cyrea dolores Canepari & Gordon, 2016
  - Cyrea erica Canepari & Gordon, 2016
  - Cyrea tessulata (Mulsant, 1850)
  - Cyrea noticollis (Mulsant, 1850)
  - Cyrea ornaticollis (Weise, 1902)
  - Cyrea renifera (Kirsch, 1876)
  - Cyrea quinquenotata (Mulsant, 1850)
  - Cyrea novemsignata (Herbst, 1793)
  - Cyrea samantha Canepari & Gordon, 2016
  - Cyrea marion Canepari & Gordon, 2016
  - Cyrea dana Canepari & Gordon, 2016
  - Cyrea stacy Canepari & Gordon, 2016
  - Cyrea ormanceayi (Mulsant, 1850)
  - Cyrea fasciata (Fabricius, 1801)
  - Cyrea jeanne Canepari & Gordon, 2016
  - Cyrea laurie Canepari & Gordon, 2016
  - Cyrea lucille Canepari & Gordon, 2016
  - Cyrea katie Canepari & Gordon, 2016
  - Cyrea kristen Canepari & Gordon, 2016
  - Cyrea vanessa Canepari & Gordon, 2016
  - Cyrea alma Canepari & Gordon, 2016
  - Cyrea elsie Canepari & Gordon, 2016
  - Cyrea sue Canepari & Gordon, 2016
  - Cyrea collaris (Mulsant, 1850)
  - Cyrea vicki Canepari & Gordon, 2016
  - Cyrea carla Canepari & Gordon, 2016
  - Cyrea tara Canepari & Gordon, 2016
  - Cyrea rosemary Canepari & Gordon, 2016
  - Cyrea flavoguttata (Mulsant, 1850)
  - Cyrea ferruginiceps (Weise, 1905)
  - Cyrea melinda Canepari & Gordon, 2016
  - Cyrea dora Canepari & Gordon, 2016
  - Cyrea allison Canepari & Gordon, 2016
  - Cyrea tamara Canepari & Gordon, 2016
  - Cyrea exclamationis (Mulsant, 1850)
  - Cyrea joy Canepari & Gordon, 2016
  - Cyrea georgia Canepari & Gordon, 2016
  - Cyrea ruizi (Brèthes, 1923)
  - Cyrea constance Canepari & Gordon, 2016
  - Cyrea lillie Canepari & Gordon, 2016
  - Cyrea languida (Mulsant, 1850)
  - Cyrea arrowi (Brèthes, 1925)
  - Cyrea courtney Canepari & Gordon, 2016
  - Cyrea marian Canepari & Gordon, 2016
  - Cyrea pseudospinalis Canepari & Gordon, 2016
  - Cyrea nigripennis (Brèthes, 1925)
  - Cyrea ustulata (Mulsant, 1850)
  - Cyrea moritzi (Mader, 1954)
  - Cyrea perlai González, 2022
  - Cyrea torresi González, 2022
  - Cyrea dieguezi González, 2022
- group undefined
  - Cyrea lucy Canepari & Gordon, 2016
  - Cyrea trina (Brèthes, 1925)
  - Cyrea suturella (Mulsant, 1853)
  - Cyrea emmae (Crotch, 1874)
  - Cyrea octupla (Mulsant, 1853)
  - Cyrea flavocalceata (Mulsant, 1850)
  - Cyrea sexguttata (Mulsant, 1850)
  - Cyrea mcclarini Szawaryn & Czerwiński, 2022
  - Cyrea napoensis González & Větrovec, 2021
