= Cyrea ruizi =

Scientific classification
- Kingdom: Animalia
- Phylum: Arthropoda
- Clade: Pancrustacea
- Class: Insecta
- Order: Coleoptera
- Suborder: Polyphaga
- Infraorder: Cucujiformia
- Family: Coccinellidae
- Genus: Cyrea
- Species: C. ruizi

Binomial name
- Cyrea ruizi (Brèthes, 1923)

Synonyms
- Curinus ruizi Bréthes, 1923; Cyra ruizi

Species of beetle

Cyrea ruizi is a species of beetle of the Coccinellidae family. It is found in Chile.

== Description ==
Adults reach a length of about 2.4 mm. They have a black body and a yellowish red head and pronotum. The elytron has three small yellow spots.
