= Cyrea willie =

Scientific classification
- Kingdom: Animalia
- Phylum: Arthropoda
- Clade: Pancrustacea
- Class: Insecta
- Order: Coleoptera
- Suborder: Polyphaga
- Infraorder: Cucujiformia
- Family: Coccinellidae
- Genus: Cyrea
- Species: C. willie

Binomial name
- Cyrea willie Canepari & Gordon, 2016

Species of beetle

Cyrea willie is a species of beetle of the family Coccinellidae. It is found in Brazil.

== Description ==
Adults reach a length of about 3 mm. They have a yellow body. The pronotum has a large black spot. The elytron is black with five large yellow spots.
