= Cyrea emiliae =

Scientific classification
- Kingdom: Animalia
- Phylum: Arthropoda
- Clade: Pancrustacea
- Class: Insecta
- Order: Coleoptera
- Suborder: Polyphaga
- Infraorder: Cucujiformia
- Family: Coccinellidae
- Genus: Cyrea
- Species: C. emiliae

Binomial name
- Cyrea emiliae (Crotch, 1874)

Synonyms
- Hyperaspis emiliae Crotch, 1874; Hyperaspis trivittata Weise, 1902; Hyperaspis mundula Weise, 1922

Species of beetle

Cyrea emiliae is a species of beetle of the family Coccinellidae. It is found in Argentina, Brazil and Paraguay.

== Description ==
Adults reach a length of about 2.3-2.7 mm. They have a yellow body. The pronotum has a black spot. The elytron has black border and black markings that are fused into one spot.
