= Cyrea joy =

Scientific classification
- Kingdom: Animalia
- Phylum: Arthropoda
- Clade: Pancrustacea
- Class: Insecta
- Order: Coleoptera
- Suborder: Polyphaga
- Infraorder: Cucujiformia
- Family: Coccinellidae
- Genus: Cyrea
- Species: C. joy

Binomial name
- Cyrea joy Canepari & Gordon, 2016

Species of beetle

Cyrea joy is a species of beetle of the family Coccinellidae. It is found in Brazil.

== Description ==
Adults reach a length of about 2.0–2.4 mm. They have a black body and yellow head. The pronotum has yellow markings. The elytron is black with a tiny yellow triangular spot.
