= Cyrea june =

Scientific classification
- Kingdom: Animalia
- Phylum: Arthropoda
- Clade: Pancrustacea
- Class: Insecta
- Order: Coleoptera
- Suborder: Polyphaga
- Infraorder: Cucujiformia
- Family: Coccinellidae
- Genus: Cyrea
- Species: C. june

Binomial name
- Cyrea june Canepari & Gordon, 2016

Species of beetle

Cyrea june is a species of beetle of the family Coccinellidae. It is found in Brazil.

== Description ==
Adults reach a length of about 2.5–3 mm. They have a yellow body. The pronotum has black spot. The elytron has three black spots.
