= Cyrea ustulata =

Scientific classification
- Kingdom: Animalia
- Phylum: Arthropoda
- Clade: Pancrustacea
- Class: Insecta
- Order: Coleoptera
- Suborder: Polyphaga
- Infraorder: Cucujiformia
- Family: Coccinellidae
- Genus: Cyrea
- Species: C. ustulata

Binomial name
- Cyrea ustulata (Mulsant, 1850)

Synonyms
- Cleothera ustulata Mulsant, 1850; Hyperaspis camelina Crotch, 1874

Species of beetle

Cyrea ustulata is a species of beetle of the family Coccinellidae. It is found in Colombia and Brazil.

== Description ==
Adults reach a length of about 2.1 mm. They have a yellow body. The pronotum has a black area and the elytron has a large black marking.
