= Cyrea januarii =

Scientific classification
- Kingdom: Animalia
- Phylum: Arthropoda
- Clade: Pancrustacea
- Class: Insecta
- Order: Coleoptera
- Suborder: Polyphaga
- Infraorder: Cucujiformia
- Family: Coccinellidae
- Genus: Cyrea
- Species: C. januarii

Binomial name
- Cyrea januarii (Brèthes, 1925)

Synonyms
- Cleothera januarii Brèthes, 1925

Species of beetle

Cyrea januarii is a species of beetle of the family Coccinellidae. It is found in Brazil.

== Description ==
Adults reach a length of about 3 mm. They have a black body and yellow head. The pronotum is black with yellow areas. The elytron is yellow bordered with black.
