= Cyrea spinalis =

Scientific classification
- Kingdom: Animalia
- Phylum: Arthropoda
- Clade: Pancrustacea
- Class: Insecta
- Order: Coleoptera
- Suborder: Polyphaga
- Infraorder: Cucujiformia
- Family: Coccinellidae
- Genus: Cyrea
- Species: C. spinalis

Binomial name
- Cyrea spinalis (Mulsant, 1853)

Synonyms
- Cleothera spinalis Mulsant, 1853

Species of beetle

Cyrea spinalis is a species of beetle of the family Coccinellidae. It is found in Bolivia and Brazil.

== Description ==
Adults reach a length of about 3.5 mm. They have a yellow body. The pronotum has a dark brown area.
