= Cyrea tamara =

Scientific classification
- Kingdom: Animalia
- Phylum: Arthropoda
- Clade: Pancrustacea
- Class: Insecta
- Order: Coleoptera
- Suborder: Polyphaga
- Infraorder: Cucujiformia
- Family: Coccinellidae
- Genus: Cyrea
- Species: C. tamara

Binomial name
- Cyrea tamara Canepari & Gordon, 2016

Species of beetle

Cyrea tamara is a species of beetle of the family Coccinellidae. It is found in Ecuador.

== Description ==
Adults reach a length of about 2.3–3.4 mm (0.091–0.134 in). They have a yellow body and a black head. The elytron is black.
