= Cyrea fasciata =

Scientific classification
- Kingdom: Animalia
- Phylum: Arthropoda
- Clade: Pancrustacea
- Class: Insecta
- Order: Coleoptera
- Suborder: Polyphaga
- Infraorder: Cucujiformia
- Family: Coccinellidae
- Genus: Cyrea
- Species: C. fasciata

Binomial name
- Cyrea fasciata (Fabricius, 1801)

Synonyms
- Coccinella fasciata Fabricius, 1801

Species of beetle

Cyrea fasciata is a species of beetle of the family Coccinellidae. It is found in Brazil, Colombia, Guyana, Surinam, Trinidad and Venezuela.

== Description ==
Adults reach a length of about 1.7–2.6 mm. They have a dark brown body and yellow head. The pronotum is yellow with a dark brown spot. The elytron has five large yellow spots.
