= Cyrea sexguttata =

Scientific classification
- Kingdom: Animalia
- Phylum: Arthropoda
- Clade: Pancrustacea
- Class: Insecta
- Order: Coleoptera
- Suborder: Polyphaga
- Infraorder: Cucujiformia
- Family: Coccinellidae
- Genus: Cyrea
- Species: C. sexguttata

Binomial name
- Cyrea sexguttata (Mulsant, 1850)

Synonyms
- Cleothera sexguttata Mulsant, 1850

Species of beetle

Cyrea sexguttata is a species of beetle of the family Coccinellidae. It is found in Brazil.

== Description ==
Adults reach a length of about 2.3 mm. They have a black body. The elytron has three small yellow spots.
