= Cyrea dora =

Scientific classification
- Kingdom: Animalia
- Phylum: Arthropoda
- Clade: Pancrustacea
- Class: Insecta
- Order: Coleoptera
- Suborder: Polyphaga
- Infraorder: Cucujiformia
- Family: Coccinellidae
- Genus: Cyrea
- Species: C. dora

Binomial name
- Cyrea dora Canepari & Gordon, 2016

Species of beetle

Cyrea dora is a species of beetle of the family Coccinellidae. It is found in Argentina.

== Description ==
Adults reach a length of about 3.5 mm. They have a yellow body and a black head. The pronotum is black, except for the lateral area, which is yellow. The elytron is yellow with black borders and black markings.
