= Cyrea flavocalceata =

Scientific classification
- Kingdom: Animalia
- Phylum: Arthropoda
- Clade: Pancrustacea
- Class: Insecta
- Order: Coleoptera
- Suborder: Polyphaga
- Infraorder: Cucujiformia
- Family: Coccinellidae
- Genus: Cyrea
- Species: C. flavocalceata

Binomial name
- Cyrea flavocalceata (Mulsant, 1850)

Synonyms
- Cleothera flavocalceata Mulsant, 1850

Species of beetle

Cyrea flavocalceata is a species of beetle of the family Coccinellidae. It is found in Brazil.

== Description ==
Adults reach a length of about 3.4 mm. They have a black body. The pronotum is also black, but about one-fifth is yellow and there is a yellow spot. The elytron is black.
