= Cyrea melaneura =

Scientific classification
- Kingdom: Animalia
- Phylum: Arthropoda
- Clade: Pancrustacea
- Class: Insecta
- Order: Coleoptera
- Suborder: Polyphaga
- Infraorder: Cucujiformia
- Family: Coccinellidae
- Genus: Cyrea
- Species: C. melanura

Binomial name
- Cyrea melanura (Mulsant, 1850)

Synonyms
- Cleothera melanura Mulsant, 1850

Species of beetle

Cyrea melanura is a species of beetle of the family Coccinellidae. It is found in Colombia.

== Description ==
Adults reach a length of about 3.1 mm. They have a yellow body. The pronotum is black with a yellow margin. The elytron has black area that becomes wider at the apex.
