= Cyrea tredecimguttata =

Scientific classification
- Kingdom: Animalia
- Phylum: Arthropoda
- Clade: Pancrustacea
- Class: Insecta
- Order: Coleoptera
- Suborder: Polyphaga
- Infraorder: Cucujiformia
- Family: Coccinellidae
- Genus: Cyrea
- Species: C. tredecimguttata

Binomial name
- Cyrea tredecimguttata (Mulsant, 1850)

Synonyms
- Cleothera tredecimguttata Mulsant, 1850

Species of beetle

Cyrea tredecimguttata is a species of beetle of the family Coccinellidae. It is found in Colombia and Ecuador.

== Description ==
Adults reach a length of about 4–5 mm. They have a black body and yellow head. The pronotum is yellow with a long black spot. The elytron has five large yellow spots.
