= Cyrea katie =

Scientific classification
- Kingdom: Animalia
- Phylum: Arthropoda
- Clade: Pancrustacea
- Class: Insecta
- Order: Coleoptera
- Suborder: Polyphaga
- Infraorder: Cucujiformia
- Family: Coccinellidae
- Genus: Cyrea
- Species: C. katie

Binomial name
- Cyrea katie Canepari & Gordon, 2016

Species of beetle

Cyrea katie is a species of beetle of the family Coccinellidae. It is found in Brazil.

== Description ==
Adults reach a length of about 2.5 mm. They have a yellow body. The pronotum is black with yellow borders. The elytron is black with five small yellow spots.
