= Cyrea gacognii =

Scientific classification
- Kingdom: Animalia
- Phylum: Arthropoda
- Clade: Pancrustacea
- Class: Insecta
- Order: Coleoptera
- Suborder: Polyphaga
- Infraorder: Cucujiformia
- Family: Coccinellidae
- Genus: Cyrea
- Species: C. gacognii

Binomial name
- Cyrea gacognii (Mulsant, 1850)

Synonyms
- Cleothera gacognii Mulsant, 1850

Species of beetle

Cyrea gacognii is a species of beetle of the family Coccinellidae. It is found in southeastern Brazil.

== Description ==
Adults reach a length of about 2.2-2.7 mm. They have a yellow body. The pronotum has a large black spot. The elytron is black with five small yellow spots.
