= Cyrea devillii =

Scientific classification
- Kingdom: Animalia
- Phylum: Arthropoda
- Clade: Pancrustacea
- Class: Insecta
- Order: Coleoptera
- Suborder: Polyphaga
- Infraorder: Cucujiformia
- Family: Coccinellidae
- Genus: Cyrea
- Species: C. devillii

Binomial name
- Cyrea devillii (Mulsant, 1850)

Synonyms
- Cleothera devillii Mulsant, 1850

Species of beetle

Cyrea devillii is a species of beetle of the family Coccinellidae. It is found in Brazil.

== Description ==
Adults reach a length of about 2.2–2.7 mm. They have a yellow body. The pronotum has a black spot. The elytron is reddish yellow with a small pale brown spot and a dark brown oval spot.
