= Cyrea samantha =

Scientific classification
- Kingdom: Animalia
- Phylum: Arthropoda
- Clade: Pancrustacea
- Class: Insecta
- Order: Coleoptera
- Suborder: Polyphaga
- Infraorder: Cucujiformia
- Family: Coccinellidae
- Genus: Cyrea
- Species: C. samantha

Binomial name
- Cyrea samantha Canepari & Gordon, 2016

Species of beetle

Cyrea samantha is a species of beetle of the family Coccinellidae. It is found in Colombia.

== Description ==
Adults reach a length of about 2.3 mm. They have a yellow body. The pronotum has a black spot. The elytron has a dark brown border and four dark brown spots.
