= Cyrea roberta =

Scientific classification
- Kingdom: Animalia
- Phylum: Arthropoda
- Clade: Pancrustacea
- Class: Insecta
- Order: Coleoptera
- Suborder: Polyphaga
- Infraorder: Cucujiformia
- Family: Coccinellidae
- Genus: Cyrea
- Species: C. roberta

Binomial name
- Cyrea roberta Canepari & Gordon, 2016

Species of beetle

Cyrea roberta is a species of beetle of the family Coccinellidae. It is found in Brazil and Paraguay.

== Description ==
Adults reach a length of about 2.3-2.8 mm. They have a yellow body. The pronotum has seven brown spots. The elytron has brown border and three brown spots.
