= Cyrea hexastigma =

Scientific classification
- Kingdom: Animalia
- Phylum: Arthropoda
- Clade: Pancrustacea
- Class: Insecta
- Order: Coleoptera
- Suborder: Polyphaga
- Infraorder: Cucujiformia
- Family: Coccinellidae
- Genus: Cyrea
- Species: C. hexastigma

Binomial name
- Cyrea hexastigma (Mulsant, 1850)

Synonyms
- Cleothera hexastigma Mulsant, 1850; Cleothera gracilis Mulsant, 1850

Species of beetle

Cyrea hexastigma is a species of beetle of the family Coccinellidae. It is found in Brazil.

== Description ==
Adults reach a length of about 3-3.8 mm. They have a reddish yellow body. The pronotum has a darker reddish spot and two dark brown spots. The elytron has three small dark brown spots.
