= Cyrea languida =

Scientific classification
- Kingdom: Animalia
- Phylum: Arthropoda
- Clade: Pancrustacea
- Class: Insecta
- Order: Coleoptera
- Suborder: Polyphaga
- Infraorder: Cucujiformia
- Family: Coccinellidae
- Genus: Cyrea
- Species: C. languida

Binomial name
- Cyrea languida (Mulsant, 1850)

Synonyms
- Cleothera languida Mulsant, 1850

Species of beetle

Cyrea languida is a species of beetle of the Coccinellidae family. It is found in Colombia, Brazil and Central America.

== Description ==
Adults reach a length of about 2.6-3.1 mm. They have a yellow body. The pronotum has five pale brown spots. The elytron is yellow without spots.
