= Cyrea vivian =

Scientific classification
- Kingdom: Animalia
- Phylum: Arthropoda
- Clade: Pancrustacea
- Class: Insecta
- Order: Coleoptera
- Suborder: Polyphaga
- Infraorder: Cucujiformia
- Family: Coccinellidae
- Genus: Cyrea
- Species: C. vivian

Binomial name
- Cyrea vivian Canepari & Gordon, 2016

Species of beetle

Cyrea vivian is a species of beetle of the family Coccinellidae. It is found in Paraguay.

== Description ==
Adults reach a length of about 2.7 mm. They have a yellow body. The pronotum has a black spot, as well as a triangular spot. The elytron has black border and four large, black spots.
