= Cyrea ormanceayi =

Scientific classification
- Kingdom: Animalia
- Phylum: Arthropoda
- Clade: Pancrustacea
- Class: Insecta
- Order: Coleoptera
- Suborder: Polyphaga
- Infraorder: Cucujiformia
- Family: Coccinellidae
- Genus: Cyrea
- Species: C. ormanceayi

Binomial name
- Cyrea ormanceayi (Mulsant, 1850)

Synonyms
- Cleothera ormanceayi Mulsant, 1850; Cleothera distinguenda Mulsant, 1850

Species of beetle

Cyrea ormanceayi is a species of beetle of the family Coccinellidae. It is found in Costa Rica, Colombia, Trinidad and Venezuela.

== Description ==
Adults reach a length of about 2 mm. They have a black body and yellow head. The pronotum is yellow with a black spot. The elytron has five yellow spots.
