= Cyrea similaris =

Scientific classification
- Kingdom: Animalia
- Phylum: Arthropoda
- Clade: Pancrustacea
- Class: Insecta
- Order: Coleoptera
- Suborder: Polyphaga
- Infraorder: Cucujiformia
- Family: Coccinellidae
- Genus: Cyrea
- Species: C. similaris

Binomial name
- Cyrea similaris (Mader, 1957)

Synonyms
- Hyperaspis (Cleothera) similaris Mader, 1957

Species of beetle

Cyrea similaris is a species of beetle of the family Coccinellidae. It is found in Bolivia.

== Description ==
Adults reach a length of about 2.7–2.8 mm. They have a yellow body. The pronotum has a brown spot. The elytron has dark brown borders and four large brown spots.
