= Cyrea jo =

Scientific classification
- Kingdom: Animalia
- Phylum: Arthropoda
- Clade: Pancrustacea
- Class: Insecta
- Order: Coleoptera
- Suborder: Polyphaga
- Infraorder: Cucujiformia
- Family: Coccinellidae
- Genus: Cyrea
- Species: C. jo

Binomial name
- Cyrea jo Canepari & Gordon, 2016

Species of beetle

Cyrea jo is a species of beetle of the family Coccinellidae. It is found in Colombia.

== Description ==
Adults reach a length of about 3-3.4 mm. They have a mostly black body. The pronotum is black with a yellow border and a small yellow spot. The elytron has five yellow spots.
